The following is a partial list of notable Brown University alumni, known as Brunonians. It includes alumni of Brown University and Pembroke College, Brown's former women's college. "Class of" is used to denote the graduation class of individuals who attended Brown, but did not or have not graduated. When solely the graduation year is noted, it is because it has not yet been determined which degree the individual earned.

MacArthur "Genius" Fellows 

 Donald Antrim (A.B. 1981) – novelist, Elect Mr. Robinson for a Better World; recipient of the 2013 MacArthur Fellowship
 Greg Asbed (B.Sc. 1985) – human rights strategist and labor organizer; recipient of the 2017 MacArthur Fellowship
 Kelly Benoit-Bird (B.Sc. 1998) – Senior Scientist at the Monterey Bay Aquarium Research Institute; recipient of the 2010 MacArthur Fellowship
 Richard Benson (1961) – photographer, Dean of the Yale School of Art (1996–2006); recipient of the 2010 MacArthur Fellowship
 Lucy Blake (A.B. 1981) – conservationist, recipient of the 2000 MacArthur Fellowship
 John C. Bonifaz  (A.B. 1959) – founder, National Voting Rights Institute, recipient of the 1999 MacArthur Fellowship
 Edwidge Danticat (M.F.A. 1993) – Haitian-American author, recipient of the 2009 MacArthur Fellowship
 Michael H. Dickinson (Sc.B. 1984) – Esther M. and Abe M. Zarem Professor of Bioengineering and Aeronautics at the California Institute of Technology; recipient of the 2001 MacArthur Fellowship
 Richard Foreman (A.B. 1959) –  playwright and avant-garde theater pioneer; recipient of the 1995 MacArthur Fellowship
 Jim Yong Kim (A.B. 1982) – 12th President of the World Bank, President Emeritus of Dartmouth College, and public health physician; recipient of the 2003 MacArthur Fellowship
 Ben Lerner (A.B. 2001, M.F.A. 2003) – poet; recipient of the 2015 MacArthur Fellowship
 David Lobell (Sc.B. 2000) –  Gloria and Richard Kushel Director at the Center on Food Security and the Environment at Stanford University; recipient of the 2015 MacArthur Fellowship
 Monica Muñoz Martinez (A.B. 2006) – public historian; recipient of the 2021 MacArthur Fellowship
 Lynn Nottage (A.B. 1986) – first female playwright to win the Pulitzer Prize twice; recipient of the 2007 MacArthur Fellowship
 Nawal M. Nour (A.B. 1988) – obstetrician and gynecologist, Kate Macy Ladd Professor at Harvard Medical School; recipient of the 2013 MacArthur Fellowship
 Lauren Redniss (A.B. 1996) – artist and writer; recipient of the 2016 MacArthur Fellowship
 Jennifer Richeson (Sc.B. 1994) – Philip R. Allen Professor of Psychology, Yale University; recipient of the 2006 MacArthur Fellowship
 Sarah Ruhl (A.B. 1997, M.F.A 2001) – playwright; recipient of the 2006 MacArthur Fellowship
 Sebastian Ruth (A.B. 1997) – violinist, recipient of the 2010 MacArthur Fellowship
 Joanna Scott (M.A. 1985) – author; recipient of the 1992 MacArthur Fellowship
 William Seeley (A.B. 1993) – Professor of Neurology and Pathology, UC San Francisco, recipient of the 2011 MacArthur Fellowship

Academia

Academic administrators 

 Jasper Adams (A.B. 1815) – President, College of Charleston; 1st President Hobart College
 Vernon Alden (A.B. 1945) – 15th President, Ohio University
 James Burrill Angell (A.B. 1849) – 3rd President, University of Michigan
 Rufus Babcock (1821) – 2nd President, Colby College
 Ravi V. Bellamkonda (Ph.D. 1994) – Dean, Pratt School of Engineering, Duke University (2016–2021); Provost and Executive Vice President for Academic Affairs, Emory University (2021-)
 Samuel Belkin (Ph.D. 1935) – 2nd President, Yeshiva University
 Lee Eliot Berk (A.B 1964) – 2nd President and namesake, Berklee College of Music
 Sarah Bolton (Sc.B. 1988) – 12th President, College of Wooster; former Dean of the College, Williams College
 Hermon Carey Bumpus (Ph.B. 1884) – 5th President, Tufts University
 Walter Burse (1920) – 2nd President, Suffolk University
 Dame Frances Cairncross (A.M. 1966) – Rector, Exeter College, Oxford
 James Tift Champlin (1834) – 7th President, Colby College
 Gordon Keith Chalmers (A.B. 1925) – 13th President, Kenyon College; 9th President, Rockford College
 Jeremiah Chaplin (1799) – Founder and 1st President, Colby College
 Oren B. Cheney (Class of 1840) – Founder and 1st President, Bates College
 Barbara Chernow (A.B. 1979) – Executive Vice President for Finance and Administration, Brown University
Aram Chobanian (A.B. 1951) – 9th President, Boston University
 Jay Coogan (A.B. 1980) – 16th President, Minneapolis College of Art and Design
 William E. Cooper (A.B., A.M. 1973) – 8th President, University of Richmond
 Robert A. Corrigan (A.B. 1957) – 12th President, San Francisco State University
Glenn Cummings (M.A.T. 1984) – 13th President, University of Southern Maine
 Eliphaz Fay (A.B. 1821) – 4th President, Colby College
 Willbur Fisk (A.B. 1815) – 1st President, Wesleyan University
 Henry Simmons Frieze (A.B. 1841) – Acting President, University of Michigan
 Edward Guiliano (1972) – 3rd President, New York Institute of Technology
 Thomas Hassan (1978) – 14th Principal, Phillips Exeter Academy; first gentleman of New Hampshire
 John Hope (1894) – 4th President, Morehouse College; 5th President, Atlanta University; the first African American in both roles; co-founder of the Niagara Movement, which became the NAACP
 Suzanne Keen (A.B. 1984, A.M. 1986) – 10th President, Scripps College
 Jim Yong Kim (A.B. 1982) – 17th President, Dartmouth College; 12th President of the World Bank
 Joan Leitzel (M.A. 1961) – 17th President, University of New Hampshire
 Luther Luedtke (Ph.D. 1971) – 5th President, California Lutheran University
 James A. MacAlister (1856) – 1st President, Drexel University
 Horace Mann (A.B. 1819) – 1st President, Antioch College; father of American public education; member of the U.S. House of Representatives
 Jonathan Maxcy (A.B. 1787) – 2nd President, Brown University; 1st President, University of South Carolina; 3rd President, Union College
 David Maxwell (A.M. 1968) – 12th President, Drake University
 Alexander Meiklejohn (A.B. 1893, A.M. 1895) – 8th President, Amherst College; Dean, Brown University; philosopher and free-speech advocate
 Alonzo G. Morón (B.A. 1932) – 8th President of Hampton University, sociologist, civil servant
 Richard L. Morrill (A.B. 1961) – 8th President, University of Richmond; 18th President, Centre College; President, Salem College
 Robert W. Morse (A.M. 1947, Ph.D. 1949) – 1st President, Case Western Reserve University
 Bernard Muir (1990) – Athletic Director, Stanford University
Samuel M. Nabrit (Ph.D. 1932) – 2nd President, Texas Southern University
 Louis E. Newman (Ph.D. 1983) – Associate Vice Provost for Undergraduate Education, Stanford University
Melissa Nobles (A.B. 1985) – Chancellor and Professor of Political Science, MIT
Eliphalet Nott (A.M. 1795) – 4th President, Union College; 3rd President, Rensselaer Polytechnic Institute; the longest serving American college president
 Inman E. Page (A.B. 1877, A.M. 1880) – President of the Lincoln Institute, Langston University, Western University, and Roger Williams University
 Lynn Pasquerella (Ph.D. 1985) – 18th President, Mount Holyoke College
 Willard Preston (A.B. 1806) – 4th President, University of Vermont
 Wendell Pritchett (A.B. 1986) – Chancellor of Rutgers University–Camden (2009–14); Provost, University of Pennsylvania (2017–21); Interim President, University of Pennsylvania (2022); first person of color to lead the University of Pennsylvania
 Suzanne M. Rivera (A.B. 1991) – 17th President, Macalester College
 Chase F. Robinson (A.B. 1985) – President and Distinguished Professor, The Graduate Center, CUNY
 Leonard Schlesinger (A.B. 1972) – 12th President, Babson College
 Arthur R. Taylor (A.B. 1957, A.M 1961) – 10th President, Muhlenberg College; President, CBS (1972–1976)
 Sir Richard Trainor (A.B. 1970) – Principal, King's College London (2004–2014); Rector, Exeter College, Oxford (2014–)
 Yang Wei (Ph.D. 1985) – President, Zhejiang University
 Nils Yngve Wessell (A.M. 1935) – 8th President, Tufts University
 Benjamin Ide Wheeler (A.B. 1875, A.M. 1878) – 8th President, University of California
 Charles Lincoln White (A.B. 1887) – 13th President, Colby College
 Beniah Longley Whitman (A.B. 1887, A.M. 1890) – 11th President, Colby College; 7th President, George Washington University
 Mary Emma Woolley (A.B. 1894, A.M 1895) – 11th President, Mount Holyoke College

Applied sciences 

 Lallit Anand (Sc.M. 1972, Ph.D. 1975) – Warren and Towneley Rohsenow Professor of Mechanical Engineering, MIT
 Panos Antsaklis (M.Sc. Ph.D. 1977) – H. Clifford and Evelyn A. Brosey Professor of Electrical Engineering, University of Notre Dame
 Ravi V. Bellamkonda (Ph.D. 1994) – Dean, Pratt School of Engineering, Duke University (2016–2021); Provost and Executive Vice President for Academic Affairs, Emory University
 Sangeeta N. Bhatia (Sc.B. 1990) – John J. and Dorothy Wilson Professor of Health Sciences and Technology and of Electrical Engineering and Computer Science, MIT
 Bernard Budiansky (Ph.D. 1950) – James Lawrence Professor of Engineering, Harvard University; recipient of the 1989 Timoshenko Medal
 Herman Chernoff (Ph.D. 1948) – Professor Emeritus of Applied Mathematics, MIT; known for the Chernoff bound, Chernoff distribution and Chernoff face
 Kathleen M. Eisenhardt (Sc.B. 1969) – Stanford W. Ascherman M.D. Professor, Department of Management Science and Engineering, Stanford University
 Tejal Desai (Sc.B. 1994) – Sorensen Family Dean of Engineering, Professor, School of Engineering, Brown University
 Philippe Fauchet (M.Sc. 1980) – Bruce and Bridgitt Evans Dean of Engineering, Vanderbilt University School of Engineering
 Leigh Hochberg (B.Sc. 1990) – L. Herbert Ballou University Professor of Engineering, Brown University; Senior Lecturer in Neurology, Harvard Medical School
 Philip G. Hodge (Ph.D. 1949) – Professor Emeritus of Mechanics, University of Minnesota
 Ayanna Howard (Sc.B. 1993) – Dean, College of Engineering, Ohio State University
 Joseph Jacobson (Sc.B 1987) – Associate Professor of Media Arts and Sciences, MIT
 Richard D. James (B.Sc. 1974) – Distinguished McKnight University Professor of Aerospace Engineering Mechanics, University of Minnesota
 Mark Kachanov (Ph.D. 1981) – Professor of Mechanical Engineering, Tufts University
 John Kim (Sc.M. 1974) – Distinguished Professor Emeritus of Mechanical and Aerospace Engineering, UCLA
 Victor Li (B.Sc. 1977, M.Sc. 1978, Ph.D. 1981) – James R. Rice Distinguished University Professor of Engineering and the E.B. Wylie Collegiate Professor of Civil Engineering, University of Michigan; inventor of engineered cementitious composites
 Reda R. Mankbadi (Ph.D. 1979) – Distinguished Professor and Founding Dean, College of Engineering, Embry–Riddle Aeronautical University
 Robert McMeeking (M.Sc. 1974, Ph.D. 1977) – Tony Evans Distinguished Professor of Structural Materials and Mechanical Engineering, UC Santa Barbara; recipient of the 2014 Timoshenko Medal
 Yves Moreau (M.Sc. 1994) – Professor of Engineering, KU Leuven
 Simon Ostrach (Sc.M. 1945, Ph.D. 1950) – Wilbert J. Austin Distinguished Professor Emeritus of Engineering, Case Western Reserve University; pioneer in space science
 Stella Pang (B.Sc. 1977) – Department Head and Chair Professor of Electronic Engineering, City University of Hong Kong
 Louise Prockter (M.Sc. Ph.D. 1999) – Chief Scientist, Space Exploration Sector, Johns Hopkins Applied Physics Laboratory, Johns Hopkins University
 Upadrasta Ramamurty (Ph.D. 1994) – Professor, Department of Materials Engineering, Indian Institute of Science
 Kavita Ramanan (M.Sc. 1993, Ph.D. 1998) – Roland George Dwight Richardson University Professor of Applied Mathematics, Brown University
 Kaliat Ramesh (Sc.M. 1985, Sc.M. 1987, Ph.D. 1988) – Alonzo G. Decker Jr. Professor of Science and Engineering, Johns Hopkins University Whiting School of Engineering
 Guruswami Ravichandran (Ph.D. 1987) – John E. Goode Jr., Professor of Aerospace and Mechanical Engineering; Otis Booth Leadership Chair, Division of Engineering and Applied Science at the California Institute of Technology
 Ares J. Rosakis (ScM. 1980, Ph.D. 1982) – Theodore von Kármán Professor of Aeronautics and Professor of Mechanical Engineering, California Institute of Technology
 Ed Scheinerman (B.Sc. 1980) –Professor of Applied Mathematics & Statistics, Johns Hopkins University
 Paul H. Steen (Sc.B. A.B., 1975) – Maxwell M. Upson Professor, Smith School of Chemical and Biomolecular Engineering, Cornell University
 Katia Sycara (Sc.B. 1969) – Edward Fredkin Research Professor of Robotics, Carnegie Mellon University
 Gretar Tryggvason (Sc.M. 1982, Ph.D. 1985) – Department Head and Charles A. Miller Jr. Distinguished Professor of Mechanical Engineering, Johns Hopkins University
 Krystyn Van Vliet (Sc.B. 1998) – Michael and Sonja Koerner Professor of Materials Science and Engineering, MIT
Richard W. Ziolkowski (Sc.B. 1974) – Litton Industries John M. Leonis Distinguished Professor, Department of Electrical and Computer Engineering, University of Arizona

Economics and management 

 Mark Aguiar (A.B. 1988) – Walker Professor of Economics and International Finance, Princeton University
 Igor Ansoff (Ph.D. 1948) – economist and applied mathematician; Founding Dean, Owen Graduate School of Management at Vanderbilt University
 Clarence Edwin Ayres (A.B. 1912, M.A. 1914) – Professor of Economics, University of Texas at Austin; leading proponent of institutional economics
 Malcolm Baker (A.B. 1992) – Robert G. Kirby Professor of Business Administration, Harvard Business School
 William A. Darity Jr. (A.B. 1974) – Samuel DuBois Cook Distinguished Professor of Public Policy, Sanford School of Public Policy at Duke University
 Steven J. Davis (A.M. 1981, Ph.D. 1986) – William H. Abbott Distinguished Service Professor of International Business and Economics, University of Chicago Booth School of Business; Senior Fellow, Hoover Institution
 Mihir A. Desai (A.B. 1989) – Mizuho Financial Group Professor of Finance, Harvard Business School; Professor of Law, Harvard Law School 
 Douglas Diamond (A.B. 1975) – Merton H. Miller Distinguished Service Professor of Finance, University of Chicago Booth School of Business; Nobel laureate (Economic Sciences, 2022)
 Karen Dynan (A.B. 1985) – Professor of the Practice, Economics Department, Harvard Kennedy School
 James Feyrer (A.M., Ph.D. 2001) – Professor and Vice-Chair of Economics, Dartmouth College
 Marvin Goodfriend (Ph.D. 1980) – Friends of Allan Meltzer Professor of Economics, Carnegie Mellon University
 John Haltiwanger (Sc.B. 1977) – Dudley and Louisa Dillard Professor of Economics and Distinguished University Professor of Economics, University of Maryland, College Park
 Janice Hammond (Sc.B.) – Jesse Philips Professor of Manufacturing, Harvard Business School 
 Jerry A. Hausman (A.B. 1968) – John and Jennie S. MacDonald Professor of Economics, MIT
 Guido Imbens (A.M. 1989, Ph.D. 1991) – Applied Econometrics Professor and Professor of Economics, Stanford Graduate School of Business; Nobel laureate (Economic Sciences, 2021) 
 Sebnem Kalemli-Ozcan (A.M. 1997, Ph.D. 2000) – Neil Moskowitz Endowed Professor of Economics, University of Maryland, College Park
 Bruce J. Katz (A.B. 1981) – Vice President, Brookings Institution; Visiting Professor, London School of Economics
 Michael Keane (Ph.D. 1989) – Australian Laureate Fellow and Professor of Economics, University of New South Wales
 Robert G. King (A.B., A.M., Ph.D.) – Professor of Economics, Boston University
 Randall Kroszner (Sc.B. 1984) – Norman R. Bobins Professor of Economics, University of Chicago Booth School of Business
 Neale Mahoney (Sc.B. 2005) – Professor of Economics, Stanford University
 Edwin Mills (A.B. 1951) – Professor Emeritus of Real Estate and Finance, Kellogg School of Management at Northwestern University
 Robert A. Moffitt (A.M. 1972, Ph.D. 1975) – Krieger-Eisenhower Professor of Economics, Johns Hopkins University
 Jonathan Morduch (A.B. 1985) – Professor of Public Policy and Economics, Robert F. Wagner Graduate School of Public Service at NYU
 Anna Nagurney (A.B. 1977, Sc.B. 1977, Sc.M. 1980, Ph.D. 1983) – John F. Smith Memorial Professor, Isenberg School of Management at University of Massachusetts Amherst
 Georgia Perakis (Sc.M. 1988, Ph.D. 1993) – William F. Pounds Professor of Management, MIT Sloan School of Management
 Eswar Prasad (A.M. 1986) – Tolani Senior Professor of Trade Policy, Cornell University; Senior Fellow, Brookings Institution
 Nancy Rothbard (A.B. 1990) – Deputy Dean and David Pottruck Professor of Management, Wharton School of the University of Pennsylvania
 David Schmittlein (A.B. 1977) – John C Head III Dean and Professor of Marketing, MIT Sloan School of Management
 Scott Shane (A.B. 1986) – A. Malachi Mixon III Professor of Entrepreneurial Studies and Professor of Economics, Case Western Reserve University
 Anthony Shorrocks (A.M. 1970) – Professor, London School of Economics; 5th Director of World Institute for Development Economics Research; 
 Julia Steinberger (Sc.B. 1996) – Professor of Ecological Economics, University of Lausanne
 Ebonya Washington (A.B. 1995) – Samuel C. Park Jr. Professor of Economics, Yale University
David N. Weil (A.B. 1982) – James and Merryl Tisch Professor of Economics, Brown University
 John Henry Williams (A.B. 1912) – Founding Dean, Harvard Kennedy School; economist of international trade theory
 Janet Yellen (A.B. 1967) – Eugene E. and Catherine M. Trefethen Professor Emeritus of Business Administration, Haas School of Business at UC Berkeley; 78th U.S. Secretary of the Treasury; 15th Chair of the Federal Reserve; the first woman in both roles

Formal sciences 

 Frederick J. Almgren Jr. (Ph.D. 1962) – Professor of Mathematics, Princeton University; recipient of a Guggenheim Fellowship
 Douglas N. Arnold (A.B. 1975) – McKnight Presidential Professor of Mathematics, University of Minnesota
 Dorothy Lewis Bernstein (Ph.D. 1939) – President, Mathematical Association of America; the first woman elected to position  
 David Blei (Sc.B. 1997) – Professor of Computer Science and Statistics, Columbia University
 Dick Bulterman (Sc.M. 1977, Ph.D. 1982) – Professor and Chair of the Department of Computer Science, Vrije Universiteit Amsterdam
 Nelson Dunford (Ph.D. 1936) – James E. English Professor of Mathematics Emeritus, Yale University; namesake of the Dunford decomposition, Dunford–Pettis property, and Dunford-Schwartz theorem; 
 Steven K. Feiner (A.B. 1973, Ph.D. 1985) – Professor of Computer Science, Columbia University
 George Forsythe (Ph.D. 1941) – founder and chair of the Computer Science Department, Stanford University; creator of the term "Computer Science"
 William Fulton (A.B. 1961) – Oscar Zariski Distinguished University Professor Emeritus, University of Michigan
 Anne Gelb (Sc.M. 1991, Ph.D. 1996)– John G. Kemeny Parents Professor of Mathematics, Dartmouth College
 Mark Goresky (Ph.D. 1976) – Member, Institute for Advanced Study; co-inventor of intersection homology
 John Guttag (A.B. 1971) – Chair of the Electrical Engineering and Computer Science Department (1999–2004), MIT
 James Hendler (M.Sc. 1983, Ph.D. 1986) – Tetherless World Professor of Computer, Web and Cognitive Sciences, Rensselaer Polytechnic Institute; one of the originators of the Semantic Web 
 Scott Klemmer (A.B. 1999) – Professor of Cognitive Science and Computer Science & Engineering, UC San Diego
 Robert Lazarsfeld (Ph.D. 1980) – Distinguished Professor of Mathematics and Chair of the Mathematics Department, Stony Brook University
 Edward D. Lazowska (A.B. 1972) – Bill & Melinda Gates Chair Emeritus, Paul G. Allen School of Computer Science & Engineering at University of Washington
Derrick Henry Lehmer (Ph.D. 1930) – Professor Emeritus of Mathematics, UC, Berkeley; "father of computational number theory"
 Katrina Ligett (Sc.B. 2004) – Associate Professor of Computer Science, Hebrew University of Jerusalem
 Michael L. Littman (Ph.D. 1996) – University Professor of Computer Science, Brown University
 Dan Margalit (Sc.B. 1998) – Professor of Mathematics, Georgia Tech
 Kathleen McKeown (A.B. 1976) – Henry and Gertrude Rothschild Professor of Computer Science and Founding Director, Data Science Institute at Columbia University
 Melanie Mitchell (A.B. 1980) – Davis Professor of Complexity, Santa Fe Institute; co-developer of Copycat
 John Coleman Moore (Ph.D. 1952) – Professor Emeritus of Mathematics, Princeton University; known for the Borel−Moore homology and Eilenberg–Moore spectral sequence
 Edward F. Moore (Ph.D. 1950) – Professor of Professor of Mathematics and Computer Science, University of Wisconsin–Madison; known for the Moore machine
 Anthony Morse (Ph.D. 1937) – Professor of Mathematics, UC Berkeley; known for the Morse–Kelley set theory, Morse–Sard theorem and the Federer–Morse theorem
 John Mylopoulos (Sc.B. 1966) – Professor Emeritus of Computer Science, University of Toronto
 David Nadler (B.Sc. 1996) – Professor of Mathematics, UC Berkeley
 David Notkin (Sc.B. 1977) – Professor of Computer Science & Engineering, University of Washington
 Tony O'Farrell (Ph.D. 1973) – Irish mathematician who is Professor Emeritus at Maynooth University
 Peter J. Olver (Sc.B. 1973) – Professor of Mathematics, University of Minnesota
 Randy Pausch (Sc.B. 1982) – Professor of Computer Science, Carnegie Mellon University
 Carl Pomerance (A.B. 1966) – Professor Emeritus of Mathematics, Dartmouth College
 Ken Ribet (A.B., A.M. 1969) – Professor of Mathematics, UC Berkeley; known for the Herbrand–Ribet theorem and Ribet's theorem
 Stefan Roth (Sc.M. 2003, Ph.D. 2007) – Professor of Computer Science, Chair of the Department of Computer Science, Technische Universität Darmstadt
 Robert Schapire (Sc.B. 1986) – former David M. Siegel '83 Professor in Computer Science, Princeton University
 Robert Sedgewick (Sc.B. 1968, Sc.M. 1970) – Department Chair and William O. Baker Professor in Computer Science, Princeton University
 Scott Shenker (Sc.B. 1978) – Professor Emeritus of Computer Science and Chief Scientist, UC Berkeley
 Shu Shien-Siu (Ph.D. 1948) – Chair Emeritus, Purdue University School of Aeronautics and Astronautics
 Joseph H. Silverman (Sc.B. 1977) – Professor of Mathematics, Brown University
 Scott A. Smolka (Ph.D. 1984) – Distinguished Professor of Computer Science, Stony Brook University
 Halil Mete Soner (M.Sc. 1983, Ph.D. 1986) – Professor of Operations Research and Financial Engineering, Princeton University
 John A. Stankovic (B.Sc. 1970, M.Sc. 1975, Ph.D. 1979) – BP America Professor of Computer Science, University of Virginia
 John Stasko (Sc.M. 1985, Ph.D. 1989) – Regents Professor, School of Interactive Computing, Georgia Tech
 Frank Tompa (Sc.B., Sc.M. 1970) – Distinguished Professor Emeritus of Computer Science, University of Waterloo
 Kari Vilonen (Ph.D. 1983) – Professor in Pure Mathematics, University of Melbourne
 Martin M. Wattenberg (A.B. 1991) – Gordon McKay Professor of Computer Science, Harvard University
 Raymond Louis Wilder (Ph.B. 1918, Sc.M. 1921) – Professor of Mathematics, University of Michigan
 Thaleia Zariphopoulou (M.Sc. 1989, Ph.D. 1989) V.F. Neuhaus Centennial Professor and Presidential Chair in Mathematics, University of Texas at Austin

Humanities 

 Linda Martín Alcoff (Ph.D. 1987) – Professor of Philosophy, Hunter College
 Margaret L. Anderson (Ph.D. 1971) – Professor Emerita of History, UC Berkeley
 Leora Auslander (Ph.D. 1988) – Arthur and Joann Rasmussen Professor in Western Civilization, Professor of European Social History, University of Chicago
 Jacques Bailly (A.B. 1988) – classicist at the University of Vermont; National Spelling Bee Official Pronouncer
 Janetta Rebold Benton (Ph.D. 1980) – Distinguished Professor of Art History, Pace University
 Olivier Berggruen (A.B. 1986) – art historian
 Bernard Bloch (Ph.D. 1935) – Professor of Linguistics, Yale University
 George Boas (A.B., A.M. 1913) – Professor of Philosophy, Johns Hopkins University
 Edgar S. Brightman (A.B. 1907, A.M. 1908) – philosopher, Martin Luther King Jr.'s advisor at Boston University
 Marcia Chatelain (A.M., Ph.D. 2008) – Professor of History and African American Studies, Georgetown University, recipient of the Pulitzer Prize for History for Franchise: The Golden Arches in Black America
 Roderick Chisholm (A.B. 1938) – Professor of Philosophy, Brown University
 James Corum (A.M.) – military historian; Lecturer, University of Salford
 Christina Crosby (Ph.D. 1982) – Professor of English, Wesleyan University; scholar of feminism and critical disability studies
 Kenneth Dean (A.B. 1979) – Raffles Professor of Humanities, National University of Singapore
 Matt Delmont (A.M. 2004, Ph.D. 2008) – Sherman Fairchild Distinguished Professor of History, Dartmouth College
 Melvin Dixon (Ph.D. 1975) – Professor of Literature, Queens College
 Anne Dufourmantelle – philosopher and psychoanalyst
 Fred Feldman (Ph.D. 1968) – Professor Emeritus of Philosophy, University of Massachusetts Amherst
 Ann Ferguson (Ph.D. 1965) – Professor Emerita of Philosophy and Women's Studies, University of Massachusetts Amherst
 Alison Fields (M.A. 2003) – Mary Lou Milner Carver Professor of Art of the American West, University of Oklahoma
 Diana Fuss (Ph.D. 1988) – Louis W. Fairchild Class of ’24 Professor of English, Princeton University
 Alexander R. Galloway (A.B. 1996) – Professor of Media, Culture, and Communication, New York University
 Gary Gerstle (A.B. 1976) – Paul Mellon Professor of American History, University of Cambridge
 Brie Gertler (Ph.D. 1997) – Commonwealth Professor of Philosophy, University of Virginia
 George Gorse (A.M. 1974, Ph.D. 1980) – Viola Horton Professor of Art History, Pomona College
 Jacqueline Wernimont (A.M 2005, Ph.D. 2009) – Distinguished Chair in Digital Humanities and Social Engagement, Dartmouth College
 John Greco (Ph.D. 1989) – Robert L. McDevitt and Catherine H. McDevitt Professor of Philosophy, Georgetown University
 Roland Greene (A.B. 1979) – Mark Pigott KBE Professor, Anthony P. Meier Family Professor of the Humanities, Director, Humanities Center, Stanford University; President, Modern Language Association (2015–16)
 Albert Harkness (1842) – founder of the American Philological Association and the American School of Classical Studies at Athens
 John Hattendorf (A.M. 1971) – Ernest J. King Professor Emeritus of Maritime History, United States Naval War College
 Dagmar Herzog (A.M. 1985, Ph.D. 1991) – Distinguished Professor of History, Daniel Rose Faculty Scholar, Graduate Center, CUNY
 Marianne Hirsch (A.B., A.M. 1970, Ph.D. 1975) – William Peterfield Trent Professor of English and Comparative Literature, Columbia University
 Charles Hill (A.B. 1957) – Senior Lecturer in the Humanities, Brady-Johnson Distinguished Fellow in Grand Strategy, Yale University
James S. Holmes (1948–1950) – founding figure in translation studies
Jean E. Howard (A.B. 1970) – George Delacorte Professor in the Humanities, Princeton University
George B. Hutchinson (A.B. 1975) – Newton C. Farr Professor of American Culture, Cornell University
Matthew Frye Jacobson (Ph.D. 1992) – Sterling Professor of American Studies and History, Yale University
Dale Jacquette (A.M. 1981, Ph.D. 1983) – Professor Ordinarius of Philosophy, University of Bern
 Gene Andrew Jarrett (A.M. 1999, Ph.D. 2002) – Dean of the Faculty and William S. Tod Professor of English, Princeton University
 Donald Kagan (A.M. 1955) – Sterling Professor Emeritus of Classics & History, Yale University; winner of the National Humanities Medal
 Matthew Kapstein (Ph.D. 1987) – Numata Visiting Professor of Buddhist Studies, University of Chicago Divinity School
 Patricia Keating (A.M. 1976, Ph.D. 1980) – Distinguished Professor and Chair of the Department of Linguistics, UCLA
David Kelley (A.B., A.M.) – philosopher, founder of The Atlas Society
 Sean Dorrance Kelly (Sc.B. 1989, M.S. 1989) – Teresa G. and Ferdinand F. Martignetti Professor of Philosophy at Harvard University
 Ari Kelman (A.M. 1993, Ph.D. 1998) – Chancellor’s Leadership Professor of History, University of California, Davis; winner of the 2014 Bancroft Prize
 Karen Leigh King (Ph.D. 1984) – Hollis Professor of Divinity, Harvard University
 Mark Kishlansky (A.M. 1972, Ph.D. 1977) – Frank Baird Jr. Professor of History, Harvard University
 Carolyn Korsmeyer (Ph.D. 1972) – Professor Emerita of Philosophy, University at Buffalo
 Jennifer Lackey (Ph.D. 2000) – Wayne and Elizabeth Jones Professor of Philosophy, Northwestern University
 Aditi Lahiri (Ph.D. 1982) – Chair of Linguistics, University of Oxford
 Wallace Lambert (A.B. 1947) – psychologist of linguistics; "widely considered the father of the psychological study of bilingualism"
Keith Lehrer (Ph.D. 1960) – Regents' Professor of Philosophy, Emeritus, University of Arizona
 Jeffrey Lesser (A.B. 1982; M.A. 1984) – Samuel Candler Dobbs Professor of History, Emory University
 Nancy MacLean (A.B. 1981, A.M. 1981) – William H. Chafe Professor of History and Public Policy, Duke University
 Sharon Marcus (A.B. 1986) – Orlando Harriman Professor of English and Comparative Literature, Columbia University
 Brian Massumi (A.B. 1979) – philosopher and social theorist, former Professor of Communication, Université de Montréal
 Brian McHale (A.B. 1974) – Arts and Humanities Distinguished Professor, The Ohio State University
 Jeffrey L. Meikle (A.B. 1971, A.M. 1971) - Stiles Professor in American Studies Emeritus, University of Texas at Austin
 Anne K. Mellor (A.B. 1963) – Distinguished Professor of English and Women's Studies, UCLA
 Nara Milanich (A.B. 1994) – Professor of History, Barnard College
 Monica Muñoz Martinez (A.B. 2006) – Associate Professor of History, UT Austin, recipient of the MacArthur Fellowship
 Ronald H. Nash (A.M. 1960) – Evangelical Baptist philosopher and apologist; Professor, Reformed Theological Seminary
 Sianne Ngai (A.B. 1993) – Andrew W. Mellon Professor of English, University of Chicago
 Kathy Peiss (Ph.D. 1982) – Roy F. and Jeannette P. Nichols Professor of American History, University of Pennsylvania
 Nelson W. Polsby (A.M. 1956) – Heller Professor of Political Science, UC Berkeley
 Arthur Upham Pope (A.B. 1904) – expert on Iranian art; founder and first director, Asia Institute
 Gerald Prince (Ph.D. 1968) – Professor of Romance Languages, University of Pennsylvania
 Arthur S. Reber (M.A. 1965, Ph.D. 1967) – psychologist known for introducing the concept of implicit learning; Broeklundian Professor, Emeritus, Brooklyn College
 Christina J. Riggs (A.B. 1993) – Professor of History of Visual Culture, Durham University
 Camille Robcis (A.B. 1999) – Professor of History and French, Columbia University, recipient of a Guggenheim Fellowship
Daniel T. Rodgers (A.B., Sc.B. 1965) – Henry Charles Lea Professor of History Emeritus, Princeton University
 Tricia Rose (A.M. 1987, Ph.D. 1993) – Chancellor's Professor of Africana Studies, Director of the Center for the Study of Race and Ethnicity in America, Brown University
 Alvin Hirsch Rosenfeld (Ph.D. 1967) – Professor of English and M. Glazer Chair and Professor of Jewish Studies, Indiana University Bloomington
James F. Ross (Ph.D. 1958) – Professor of Philosophy and Law, University of Pennsylvania
John Howland Rowe (A.B. 1939) – Professor Emeritus of Anthropology, UC Berkeley
 Mari Ruti (A.B. 1988) – Distinguished Professor of Critical Theory and of Gender and Sexuality Studies, University of Toronto Mississauga
 Nathan Schneider (A.B. 2006) – journalist; Assistant Professor of Media Studies, University of Colorado Boulder
 Daniel R. Schwarz (Ph.D. 1968) – Frederic J. Whiton Professor of English Literature & Stephen H. Weiss Presidential Fellow, Cornell University
 Julius S. Scott (A.B 1973) – scholar of slavery and Caribbean and Atlantic history, author, The Common Wind
Russ Shafer-Landau (A.B. 1986) – Professor of Philosophy at the University of Wisconsin, Madison
 Ethan H. Shagan (A.B. 1994) – Zaffaroni Family Chair in Education of the History Department, UC Berkeley
 Tracy Denean Sharpley-Whiting (Ph.D. 1994) – Gertrude Conaway Vanderbilt Distinguished Professor of Humanities, Chair of African American and Diaspora Studies, Vanderbilt University
 Maxim D. Shrayer (A.B. 1989) – Professor of Russian, English, and Jewish Studies, Boston University
 Kaja Silverman (Ph.D. 1977) – Katherine and Keith L. Sachs Professor of Art History, University of Pennsylvania
 Richard Slotkin (Ph.D. 1966) – Olin Professor of English Emeritus, Wesleyan University
 Timothy D. Snyder (A.B. 1991) – Richard C. Levin Professor of History, Yale University, Permanent Fellow at the Institute for Human Sciences
 David Sosa (A.B. 1989) – Professor and Chair of Philosophy, University of Texas at Austin
 Jeffrey Stout (A.B. 1972) – Professor Emeritus of Religion, Princeton University
 David Summers (A.B. 1963) – William R. Kenan Jr. Professor Emeritus of Art Theory and Italian Renaissance Art, University of Virginia.
 Charles Taliaferro (A.M., Ph.D. 1984) – Oscar and Gertrude Boe Overby Distinguished Professor of Philosophy, St. Olaf College
 Richard Taylor (Ph.D. 1959) – philosopher; subject of David Foster Wallace's prize-winning undergraduate thesis
John L. Thomas (Ph.D. 1961) – George L. Littlefield Professor of American History Emeritus, Brown University; winner of the 1964 Bancroft Prize
 Salamishah Tillet (M.A.T. 1997) – Henry Rutgers Professor of African American Studies and Creative Writing, Rutgers University–Newark; recipient of the Pulitzer Prize for Criticism 
 Francesca Trivellato (Ph.D. 2004) – Andrew W Mellon Professor in the School of Historical Studies, Institute for Advanced Study
 Adam Ulam (A.B. 1943) – Gurney Professor of History and Political Science, Harvard University; one of the world's foremost authorities on Russia and the Soviet Union
 Dell Upton (M.A. 1975, Ph.D. 1980) – Chair of the Department of Art History, University of California, Los Angeles
 Geoffrey Wawro (A.B. 1983) – Professor of Military History and Director of the Military History Center, University of North Texas
 Charles Edwin Wilbour (Class of 1854) – Egyptologist, co-discoverer of the Elephantine Papyri
 Dean Zimmerman (Ph.D. 1992) – Professor of Philosophy, Rutgers University
Steven Zwicker (Ph.D. 1969) – Stanley Elkin Professor in the Humanities, Washington University in St. Louis

Law 

 Herman Vandenburg Ames – legal scholar, Professor of American Constitutional History, University of Pennsylvania
Richard Reeve Baxter (A.B. 1942) – Judge, International Court of Justice; Manley Hudson Professor of Law, Harvard Law School
Karima Bennoune (A.B. 1988) – Homer G. Angelo and Ann Berryhill Endowed Chair and Martin Luther King Jr. Professor of Law, UC Davis School of Law
Samuel W. Buell (A.B. 1987) – Bernard M. Fishman Distinguished Professor of Law, Duke University School of Law
Zechariah Chafee (A.B. 1907) – First Amendment scholar; University Professor of Law, Harvard University
 Sarah Cleveland (A.B. 1987) – Louis Henkin Professor of Human and Constitutional Rights, Columbia Law School
 Jennifer Daskal (A.B. 1994) – Professor of Law, Washington College of Law at American University
 Lawrence Douglas (A.B. 1982) – James J. Grosfeld Professor of Law, Jurisprudence and Social Thought, Amherst College
 Justin Driver (A.B. 1997) – Robert R. Slaughter Professor of Law, Yale Law School
 Heidi Li Feldman (A.B. 1986) – Professor of Law, Georgetown University Law Center
 Daniel Fischel (A.M. 1974) – Lee and Brena Freeman Professor Emeritus of Law and Business and Dean Emeritus, University of Chicago Law School
 James Forman Jr. (A.B. 1988) – J. Skelly Wright Professor of Law, Yale Law School; Pulitzer Prize-winning writer, Locking Up Our Own: Crime and Punishment in Black America
 Kent Greenfield (A.B. 1984) – Professor of Law and Dean's Distinguished Scholar, Boston College Law School
 Henry B. Hansmann (A.B. 1967) – Oscar M. Ruebhausen Professor Emeritus of Law, Yale Law School
Harold Dexter Hazeltine (A.B. 1894) – Downing Professor of the Laws of England (1919–1942), University of Cambridge
Sonia Katyal (A.B. 1993) – Distinguished Haas Chair, UC Berkeley School of Law
 David Kennedy (A.B. 1976) – Manley O. Hudson Professor of Law and Director of the Institute for Global Law and Policy, Harvard Law School
 Larry Kramer (A.B. 1980) – Richard E. Lang Professor of Law and Dean Emeritus, Stanford Law School; president of the Hewlett Foundation
 Bruce H. Mann (A.B., A.M. 1972) – Carl F. Schipper Jr. Professor of Law at Harvard Law School, husband of U.S. Senator Elizabeth Warren
 Eric L. Muller (1984) – Dan K. Moore Distinguished Professor of Law in Jurisprudence and Ethics, University of North Carolina School of Law
Wendell Pritchett (A.B. 1986) – James S. Riepe Presidential Professor of Law and Education, University of Pennsylvania Law School
Alexander A. Reinert (A.B. 1994) – Max Freund Professor of Litigation & Advocacy, Cardozo School of Law at Yeshiva University
 Vincent Rougeau (A.B. 1985) – President, College of the Holy Cross; Dean Emeritus, Boston College Law School
 Paul M. Schwartz (A.B. 1981) – Jefferson E. Peyser Professor of Law, UC Berkeley School of Law
 Harry Shulman (A.B. 1923) – Dean Emeritus, Yale Law School
 Kenneth Starr (A.M. 1969) – Duane and Kelly Roberts Dean Emeritus, Pepperdine University School of Law; Solicitor General of the United States (1989–93); Independent Counsel for the Whitewater controversy; 14th President of Baylor University
 Francis Wayland III (A.B. 1846) – Dean Emeritus, Yale Law School

Medicine and public health 

 Cheryl A. M. Anderson (A.B. 1992) – Professor and Dean, Herbert Wertheim School of Public Health, UC San Diego
 Louise Aronson (A.B. 1986) – author; Professor of Geriatrics, University of California, San Francisco
Ann Arvin (A.B. 1966) – Lucile Salter Packard Professor of Pediatrics and Professor of Microbiology and Immunology Emerita, Stanford University School of Medicine
 Aaron T. Beck (A.B. 1942) – "father of cognitive behavioral therapy"; founder of the Beck Institute for Cognitive Behavior Therapy at the University of Pennsylvania; winner of the Lasker Award
Jonathan Berek (M.M.Sc. 1973) – Laurie Kraus Lacob Professor, Stanford University School of Medicine
 John M. Barry (A.B. 1968) – author; Professor, Tulane University School of Public Health and Tropical Medicine
 Linda Bartoshuk (Ph.D. 1965) – Presidential Endowed Professor of Community Dentistry and Behavioral Science, University of Florida
Mark S. Blumenkranz (A.B. 1972, M.D. 1975, M.M.Sc. 1976) – H.J. Smead Professor Emeritus, Stanford University School of Medicine
Atul Butte (A.B. 1991, M.D. 1995) – Priscilla Chan and Mark Zuckerberg Distinguished Professor, University of California, San Francisco; Director, Baker Computational Health Sciences Institute
Christopher G. Chute (A.B. 1977, M.D. 1982) – Bloomberg Distinguished Professor of Health Informatics at Johns Hopkins University
 Barbara E. Ehrlich (Sc.B.  1974) – Professor of Pharmacology and of Cellular And Molecular Physiology, Yale School of Medicine
Nancy Etcoff (A.B.) – Assistant Clinical Professor in Psychology, Harvard Medical School
Stanley Falkow (Ph.D. 1961) – father of microbiology, discoverer of the molecular nature of antibiotic resistance; Robert W. and Vivian K. Cahill Professor of Microbiology and Immunology, Stanford University School of Medicine; winner of the Lasker Award
 James D. Griffin (A.B. 1970) – Professor, Harvard Medical School; Chair of Medical Oncology, Dana–Farber Cancer Institute; Director of Medical Oncology, Brigham and Women's Hospital
 Tina Hartert (A.B. 1985) –  Lulu H. Owen Chair in Medicine and Vice President for Translational Research, Vanderbilt University
 Arthur L. Horwich (A.B. 1972, M.D. 1975) – Sterling Professor of Genetics and Professor of Pediatrics, Yale School of Medicine; winner of the Lasker Award, Shaw Prize, and Breakthrough Prize; discoverer of the functions and mechanisms of chaperone-mediated protein folding
Howard Hu (B.Sc. 1976) – Flora L. Thornton Chair and Professor of Population and Public Health Sciences, Keck School of Medicine of USC; Founding Dean, Dalla Lana School of Public Health at the University of Toronto
William Kessen (Sc.M. 1950) – Eugene Higgins Professor Emeritus of Psychology and Professor of Pediatrics, Yale University
 Jim Yong Kim (A.B. 1982) – President, Dartmouth College; co-founder of Partners In Health; Professor of Medicine and Social Medicine and Chair of the Department of Social Medicine at Harvard Medical School; Chief of the Division of Social Medicine and Health Inequalities at Brigham and Women's Hospital; Director of the François-Xavier Bagnoud Center for Health and Human Rights; former director of the World Health Organization's HIV/AIDS department; recipient of the MacArthur Fellowship; 12th President of the World Bank
 Beth Levine (A.B. 1981) – Charles Cameron Sprague Distinguished Chair in Biomedical Sciences, UT Southwestern Medical Center
 Jonathan S. Lewin (A.B. 1981) – Executive Vice President for Health Affairs, Emory University; Professor, Emory School of Medicine and Rollins School of Public Health
 David C. Lewis (A.B. 1957) – Professor Emeritus of Medicine and Community Health and Donald G. Millar Distinguished Professor of Alcohol and Addiction Studies, Brown University.
 Stacy Tessler Lindau (M.D. 1996) – Catherine Lindsay Dobson Professor of Obstetrics and Gynecology and Director of the Program in Integrative Sexual Medicine Director, University of Chicago
George Makari (A.B. 1982) – Professor of Psychiatry and Director of the De Witt Wallace Institute for the History of Psychiatry, Weill Cornell Medicine
Joseph Matarazzo (A.B. 1946) – 98th President of the American Psychological Association, chair of the first department of medical psychology in the United States
Jessica Meir (A.B. 1999) – NASA astronaut; former Assistant Professor of Anesthesia, Harvard Medical School
 Craig C. Mello (Sc.B. 1982) – Nobel laureate (2006, Physiology or Medicine); Blais University Chair in Molecular Medicine, University of Massachusetts Medical School
 Lloyd B. Minor (Sc.B. 1979, M.D. 1982) – Carl and Elizabeth Naumann Dean, Stanford University School of Medicine; former Provost and Senior Vice President for Academic Affairs, Johns Hopkins University
 Mark Musen (Sc.B. 1977, M.D. 1980) – Professor of Biomedical Informatics and of Biomedical Data Science, Stanford University; Director, Stanford Center for Biomedical Informatics Research
 Srihari S. Naidu (Sc.B. 1993, M.D. 1997) – Professor of Medicine, New York Medical College
 Jordan S. Orange (A.B., Ph.D., 1996, M.D., 1997) – Chair of Pediatrics, Columbia University College of Physicians and Surgeons; Pediatrician-in-Chief of New York-Presbyterian/Morgan Stanley Children’s Hospital
Thomas G. Plante (Sc.B. 1982) – clinical psychologist; Augustin Cardinal Bea, S.J. University Professor of Psychology, Santa Clara University
Paul Ridker (B.Sc.. 1981) – Eugene Braunwald Professor of Medicine, Harvard Medical School; Director of the Center for Cardiovascular Disease Prevention, Brigham and Women's Hospital
 Janet Sinsheimer (B.Sc. 1979) – Professor of Biostatistics, Biomathematics, and Human Genetics, Fielding School of Public Health, UCLA
Thomas A. Wadden (A.B. 1975) – Albert J. Stunkard Professor of Psychology in Psychiatry, Perelman School of Medicine at the University of Pennsylvania
 Augustus A. White (A.B. 1957) – Ellen and Melvin Gordon Distinguished Professor of Medical Education and Professor of Orthopedic Surgery, Harvard Medical School

Natural sciences 

 Anthony Aguirre (Sc.B. 1995) – Faggin Family Presidential Chair for the Physics of Information, UC Santa Cruz
 Stephon Alexander (Ph.D. 2000) – theoretical physicist and musician, Professor of Physics, Brown University
 Edgar Allen (Sc.B. 1915, A.M. 1916, Ph.D. 1921) – anatomist and physiologist, discoverer of estrogen and father of endocrinology
 Amy Arnsten (A.B. 1976) – Albert E. Kent Professor of Neuroscience and Professor of Psychology, Yale University
Raymond Arvidson (Ph.D. 1974) – James S. McDonnell Distinguished University Professor of Earth and Planetary Sciences, Washington University in St. Louis
Biman Bagchi (Ph.D. 1980) – biophysical chemist, theoretical chemist; Amrut Mody Professor, Indian Institute of Science
 Mark Bear (Ph.D. 1984) – Picower Professor of Neuroscience, Picower Institute for Learning and Memory, MIT; former Howard Hughes Medical Investigator
 Joy M. Bergelson (Sc.B. 1984) – Dorothy Schiff Professor of Genomics, New York University
Marianne Bronner (Sc.B. 1975) – Edward B. Lewis Professor of Biology; Director of the Beckman Institute, California Institute of Technology
 Stephen L. Buchwald (Sc.B. 1977) – Camille Dreyfus Professor of Chemistry, MIT; developed Buchwald-Hartwig amination
 Sankar Das Sarma (Ph.D. 1979) – Distinguished University Professor and Richard E. Prange Chair in Physics, University of Maryland, College Park
Richard E. Carson (Sc.B. 1977) – Professor of Radiology and Biomedical Imaging and of Biomedical Engineering, Yale University
Andrew G. Clark (Sc.B. 1976) – Jacob Gould Schurman Professor of Population Genetics and Chair of Computational Biology, Cornell University
 Julia Clarke (A.B. 1995) – John A. Wilson Professor in Vertebrate Paleontology, University of Texas at Austin
 Tejal A. Desai (Sc.B. 1994) – bioengineer and therapeutic nanotechnologist; Sorensen Family Dean of Engineering, Brown University School of Engineering
 Michael H. Dickinson (Sc.B. 1984) – Zarem Professor of Bioengineering and Biology, California Institute of Technology; recipient of the MacArthur Fellowship
 Neil Donahue (B.Sc. 1985) – atmospheric chemist; Thomas Lord Professor of Chemical Engineering, Carnegie Mellon University
 John Donoghue (Ph.D. 1979) – H.M. Wriston Professor of Neuroscience and Engineering, Brown University
Bethany Ehlmann (M.S. 2008, Ph.D. 2010) — president of The Planetary Society; Professor of Planetary Science, California Institute of Technology; Rhodes Scholar
Anne Fausto-Sterling (Ph.D. 1970) – major contributor to sexology and biology of gender; Nancy Duke Lewis Professor of Biology and Gender Studies, Brown University
 W. Tecumseh Fitch (A.B. 1986, Ph.D. 1994) – Professor of Cognitive Biology, University of Vienna
Raymond Fuoss (Ph.D. 1932) – Sterling Professor Chair of Chemistry, Yale University
Paul Garabedian (A.B. 1946) – Director of the Division of Computational Fluid Dynamics, Courant Institute of Mathematical Sciences, New York University
 Margaret Gardel (Sc.B. 1998) – Horace B. Horton Professor of Physics, University of Chicago
 Miriam B. Goodman (B.Sc. 1986) – Mrs. George A. Winzer Professor of Cell Biology, Stanford University; Chair, Stanford Neuroscience Institute
Andrew V. Granato (Ph.D. 1955) – Professor Emeritus of Physics, University of Illinois at Urbana–Champaign
Alan Grossman (Sc.B. 1979) – Praecis Professor of Biology and Department Head of Biology, MIT
David Grinspoon (A.B., Sc.B.) – astrobiologist; Senior Scientist, Planetary Science Institute
 James W. Head (Ph.D. 1969) – Louis and Elizabeth Scherck Distinguished Professor Emeritus of the Geological Sciences, Brown University
Arthur Hoag (A.B. 1942) – astronomer; discoverer of Hoag's Object
 Michael R. Hoffmann (Ph.D. 1973) – John S. and Sherry Chen Professor of Environmental Science, Caltech
 Albrecht Hofmann (Ph.D. 1969) – Director Emeritus, Max Planck Institute for Chemistry, ForMemRS
 John Edwards Holbrook (A.B. 1815) – zoologist, herpetologist, and naturalist
Donald C. Hood (Ph.D. 1969) – James F. Bender Professor in Psychology and Professor of Ophthalmic Science, Columbia University
Arthur L. Horwich (A.B. 1972, M.D. 1975) – Sterling Professor of Genetics and Professor of Pediatrics, Yale School of Medicine; winner of the Lasker Award, Albany Medical Center Prize, Shaw Prize, and Breakthrough Prize; discoverer of the functions and mechanisms of chaperone-mediated protein folding
Richard Ivry (A.B. 1981) – Distinguished Professor in the Department of Psychology, UC Berkeley
Bor-ming Jahn (M.Sc. 1967) – Distinguished Chair Emeritus in Geosciences, National Taiwan University
Lucy Jones (A.B. 1976) – seismologist
 Richard Kaner (A.B. 1980) – Dr. Myung Ki Hong Endowed Chair in Materials Innovation, UCLA
 Suzanne Mahlburg Kay (Ph.D. 1975) – William & Katherine Snee Professor of Geological Sciences Emeritus, Cornell University
Brian Keating (M.Sc. 1995, Ph.D. 2000) – Chancellor's Distinguished Professor of Physics, UC San Diego
Steven Kliewer (B.Sc. 1985) – Diana K. and Richard C. Strauss Distinguished Chair in Developmental Biology, University of Texas Southwestern Medical Center
Philip Kocienski  (Ph.D. 1971) – Professor Emeritus of Organic Chemistry, University of Leeds
 Clifford Kubiak (Sc.B 1975) – Distinguished Professor and Harold C. Urey Chair in Chemistry, UC San Diego
Krishna Kumar (Ph.D. 1996) – Robinson Professor in Chemistry, Tufts University
Ka Yee Christina Lee (Sc.B. 1986) – 14th Provost and David Lee Shillinglaw Distinguished Service Professor of Chemistry, University of Chicago
 Wen-Hsiung Li (Ph.D. 1972) – James Watson Professor of Ecology and Evolution, University of Chicago
 Robert Bruce Lindsay (A.B., Sc.M. 1920) – Chair of the Physics Department and Dean of the Graduate School, Brown University; recipient of the ASA Gold Medal
 David Lobell (Sc.B. 2000) – Gloria and Richard Kushel Director at the Center on Food Security and the Environment and Professor in the Department of Earth System Science, Stanford University; recipient of a MacArthur Fellowship
 Robert H. MacArthur (A.M. 1953) – founding figure in evolutionary ecology; Professor, University of Pennsylvania and Princeton University
 Nick McCave (Ph.D. 1967) – Woodwardian Professor of Geology, Department of Earth Sciences, University of Cambridge; fellow, St John's College, Cambridge
Warren Meck (Ph.D. 1982) – Professor of Psychology and Neuroscience, Duke University
 Kenneth R. Miller (Sc.B. 1970) – Professor of Biology, Brown University
 John F. Mustard (M.Sc. 1986, Ph.D. 1990) – Professor of Earth, Environmental, and Planetary Sciences, Brown University
 Myung Kyungjae (Ph.D. 1999) – biologist, Distinguished Professor, Ulsan National Institute of Science and Technology
Samuel M. Nabrit (Ph.D. 1932) – first African American to receive doctorate degree from Brown University; first African American trustee at Brown University; first African American appointed to the U.S. Atomic Energy Commission; second president of Texas Southern University
Michael Paradiso (Ph.D. 1984) – Sidney A. Fox and Dorothea Doctors Fox Professor of Ophthalmology and Visual Science and Professor of Neuroscience, Brown University
Robert L. Park (Ph.D. 1964) – Professor Emeritus of Physics, University of Maryland, College Park; former Director of Public Information at the American Physical Society
 Robert Parr (A.B. 1942) – Professor Emeritus of Chemistry, UNC Chapel Hill; co-founder of quantum chemistry
Ainissa Ramirez (Sc.B. 1990) – material scientist and science communicator
 Maureen Raymo (Sc.B 1982) – paleoclimatologist; Bruce C. Heezen/Lamont Research Professor and Director of the Lamont-Doherty Core Repository, Lamont–Doherty Earth Observatory; Co-Founding Dean, Columbia Climate School
 Collin Roesler (Sc.B. 1985) – William R. Kenan Professor of Earth and Oceanographic Science, Bowdoin College
 Rachel Rosen (Sc.B.) – Associate Professor of Physics, Columbia University
 Carolyn Rovee-Collier (M.Sc. 1964, Ph.D. 1966) – Professor of Psychology, Rutgers University; pioneering developmental psychologist
David M. Sabatini (Sc.B. 1990) – Professor of Biology, MIT; Member, Whitehead Institute; Howard Hughes Medical Investigator; discoverer of mTOR
 Jenny Saffran (A.B. 1991) – Vilas Distinguished Achievement Professor of Psychology, University of Wisconsin
Ellery Schempp (Ph.D. 1967) – physicist, primary student involved in the landmark 1963 Supreme Court case, Abington School District v. Schempp
 William Seeley (A.B. 1993) – Zander Family Endowed Professor in Neurology, UC San Francisco, recipient of the MacArthur Fellowship
 Michael Shadlen (A.B. 1981, M.D. 1988) – Professor of Neuroscience, Columbia University, Howard Hughes Medical Institute Investigator
 Vijay Balakrishna Shenoy (Ph.D. 1998) – Professor of Physics, Indian Institute of Science
 Gabriela Schlau-Cohen (B.Sc.  2003) – Associate Professor of Chemistry, MIT
Barbara Shinn-Cunningham (Sc.B. 1986) – Director, Carnegie Mellon Neuroscience Institute, George A. and Helen Dunham Cowan Professor, Carnegie Mellon University
Steven H. Simon (Sc.B. 1990) – Professor of Physics, University of Oxford
 Daniel L. Stein (Sc.B. 1975) – Professor of Physics and Mathematics, New York University
 Eliot Stellar (M.Sc. 1942, Ph.D. 1947) – Provost Emeritus, University of Pennsylvania; one of the founders of behavioral neuroscience
James W. Stigler (A.B. 1976) – Distinguished Professor of Psychology, UCLA
Jesse Thaler (Sc.B. 2002) – Professor of Physics, MIT; Director, NSF AI Institute for Artificial Intelligence and Fundamental Interactions
 Jessica Tierney (A.B. 2005, M.Sc. 2008, Ph.D. 2010) – Associate Professor of Geosciences and Thomas R. Brown Distinguished Chair in Integrative Science, University of Arizona
 Jan Peter Toennies (Ph.D. 1957) – Director Emeritus, Max Planck Institute for Dynamics and Self-Organization; Professor Emeritus of Physics, University of Göttingen
Stefanie Tompkins (M.Sc. 1993, Ph.D. 1997) – Director, DARPA; former vice president for Research and Technology Transfer, Colorado School of Mines
Mark Trodden (M.Sc., Ph.D. 1995) – Fay R. and Eugene L. Langberg Professor and Department Chair of Physics, Co-Director of the Penn Center for Particle Cosmology, University of Pennsylvania
Fyodor Urnov (Ph.D. 1996) – Professor of Genetics, Genomics, and Development, University of California, Berkeley
John S. Werner (Ph.D. 1979) – Distinguished Professor in the Departments of Ophthalmology and Vision Science and Neurobiology, Physiology, and Behavior, UC Davis
Xi-Cheng Zhang (Ph.D. 1986) – Parker Givens Chair of Optics, University of Rochester; Director of Institute of Optics
 Maria Zuber (Ph.D. 1986) – E. A. Griswold Professor of Geophysics and Vice President for Research, MIT; NASA planning advisor; Co-chair of the Council of Advisors on Science and Technology

Social sciences 

 Massimo Livi Bacci (1960–61) – Professor Emeritus of Demography, University of Florence
Mary Beaudry (A.M. 1975, Ph.D. 1980) – Professor of Archaeology, Anthropology, and Gastronomy, Boston University
 Peter Bearman (A.B. 1978) – Jonathan R. Cole Professor of the Social Sciences, Columbia University
 Aaron Belkin (A.B. 1988) – Professor of Political Science, San Francisco State University; authority on LGBT people in the United States Armed Forces
 Adia Benton (A.B. 1999) – cultural and medical anthropologist, Associate Professor of Anthropology at Northwestern University
 Kenneth A. Bollen (A.M. 1975, Ph.D. 1977) – Henry Rudolph Immerwahr Distinguished Professor in the Department of Psychology and Neuroscience, UNC Chapel Hill
 Jason Bordoff (A.B. 1994) – Co-Founding Dean of the Columbia Climate School, Founding Director of the Center on Global Energy Policy, School of International and Public Affairs, Columbia University
 Selmer Bringsjord (Ph.D. 1987) – Chair of the Department of Cognitive Science, Rensselaer Polytechnic Institute
 Melani Cammett (A.B. 1991) – Clarence Dillon Professor of International Affairs, Harvard University; Director, Weatherhead Center for International Affairs; Professor, Harvard T.H. Chan School of Public Health
 Prudence Carter (B.Sc. 1991) –  Sarah and Joseph Jr. Dowling Professor of Sociology, Brown University; Mary E. Pardee Professor and Dean of the Graduate School of Education, UC Berkeley (2016–2021)
Neta Crawford (A.B. 1985) – Montague Burton Professor of International Relations, Oxford University
Lee Drutman (A.B. 1999) –  Senior Fellow, New America; Lecturer, Johns Hopkins University
Emily Falk (Sc.B. 2004) – Professor of Communication, Psychology, and Marketing, Annenberg School for Communication at the University of Pennsylvania
 William H. Frey (A.M. 1971, Ph.D. 1974) – Senior Fellow in the Metropolitan Policy Program, Brookings Institution
Ester Fuchs (A.M. 1974) – Professor of International and Public Affairs and Political Science, Columbia University SIPA
 Robert M. Gagné (Sc.M 1939, Ph.D. 1940) – educational psychologist; Professor, Florida State University; author of Conditions of Learning
 John Ghazvinian (A.B. 1996) – Executive Director, Middle East Center, University of Pennsylvania
 John Wesley Gilbert (A.B. 1888, A.M. 1891) – first African American to receive an A.M. from Brown, first African American archaeologist
Michael Inzlicht (Sc.M. 1999, Ph.D. 2001) – Professor of Psychology, University of Toronto Scarborough
 David Kertzer (A.B. 1969) – Paul Dupee University Professor of Social Science, Brown University; recipient of the 2015 Pulitzer Prize for Biography or Autobiography
 Michael Kimmel (M.A. 1974) – Distinguished Professor of Sociology, Stony Brook University
 Eric Klinenberg (A.B. 1993) – Professor of Sociology and Helen Gould Shepard Professor in Social Science, New York University
 Prema Kurien (A.M. 1989, Ph.D. 1993) – Professor of Sociology, Syracuse University
 Harold Leavitt (Sc.M. 1944) – pioneer in management psychology; Walter Kenneth Kilpatrick Professor of Organizational Behavior, Stanford University
 Jacob T. Levy (A.B. 1993) – Tomlinson Professor of Political Theory and Chair of the Department of Political Science, McGill University
Ogden Lindsley (A.B. 1948, Sc.M. 1950) – developer of precision teaching; Professor, University of Kansas
 Geoffrey Loftus (A.B. 1967) – Professor Emeritus of Psychology, University of Washington
 Sabina Magliocco (A.B. 1980) – Professor of Sociocultural Anthropology, University of British Columbia
 Leslie McCall (A.B. 1986) – Presidential Professor of Political Science and Sociology, Graduate Center, CUNY
Ruth Milkman (A.B. 1975) – Distinguished Professor of Sociology, Graduate Center, CUNY; former president, American Sociological Association
 Melissa Nobles (A.B. 1985) – Chancellor and Professor of Political Science, MIT; Kenan Sahin Dean of the MIT School of Humanities, Arts, and Social Sciences (2015–2021)
Lloyd Ohlin (A.B. 1940) – sociologist and criminologist; Professor Emeritus, Harvard University, Columbia University, University of Chicago
 Hal Pashler (A.B. 1980) – Distinguished Professor of Psychology, UC San Diego
 Thomas Pepinsky (A.B. 2001) – Walter F. LaFeber Professor of Government, Cornell University
 Nelson W. Polsby (A.M. 1957) – Heller Professor of Political Science, UC Berkeley, member, Council on Foreign Relations
Imam Prasodjo (Ph.D. 1997) –Professor in the Department of Social and Political Science, University of Indonesia
Jennifer Richeson (Sc.B. 1994) – Philip R. Allen Professor of Psychology, Yale University; MacArthur Fellowship recipient
 Bruce Riedel (A.B. 1975) – Senior Fellow, Saban Center for Middle East Policy at the Brookings Institution; Professor, Johns Hopkins SAIS
 Lisa Rofel (A.B. 1975) – Professor Emerita of Anthropology, UC Santa Cruz
 Eldar Shafir (A.B. 1984) – Class of 1987 Professor of Behavioral Science and Public Policy and Professor of Psychology and Public Affairs, Princeton University
 Patrick Sharkey (A.B. 2000) – Professor of Sociology and Public Affairs, Princeton University
 William Herbert Sheldon (A.B. 1919) – psychologist, creator of the field of somatotype and constitutional psychology
 Rachel Sherman (A.B. 1991) – Professor and Chair of Sociology, The New School for Social Research
 Adam T. Smith (A.B. 1990) – Distinguished Professor of Arts and Sciences in Anthropology, Cornell University
Richard Solomon (A.B. 1940, A.M. 1942, Ph.D. 1947) – experimental psychologist; author of the opponent-process theory of emotion; James M. Skinner University Professor of Science, University of Pennsylvania
 Erroll Southers (A.B. 1978) – Director of the Safe Communities Institute and Homegrown Violent Extremism Studies, USC Price School of Public Policy
 Deborah A. Thomas (A.B. 1988) – R. Jean Brownlee Professor of Anthropology and Director of the Center for Experimental Ethnography, University of Pennsylvania
 Fred Turner (A.B. 1984) – Harry and Norman Chandler Professor of Communication, Stanford University
 Khachig Tölölyan (Ph.D. 1975) – founding figure in diaspora studies; Professor Emeritus of English and Letters, Wesleyan University
 Jeffrey K. Tulis (A.M. 1974) - Professor of Government, The University of Texas at Austin
Sam Wineburg (Class of 1980) – Margaret Jacks Professor of Education Emeritus, Stanford University
Deborah J. Yashar (A.B. 1985) – Professor of Politics and International Affairs, Princeton University

Others 

 Asger Aaboe (Ph.D. 1957) – Professor Emeritus of the History of Science, Mathematics and of Near Eastern Languages and Literatures, Yale University
Ryan S. Baker (B.Sc. 2000) – Professor, University of Pennsylvania Graduate School of Education; Director, Penn Center for Learning Analytics
Albert T. Corbett (A.B. 1972) – Associate Research Professor Emeritus of Human–Computer Interaction, Carnegie Mellon University
Julie Beth Lovins (A.B. 1968) – computational linguist who developed the first stemming algorithm for word matching
Jamie Metzl (A.B. 1990) – futurist; Senior Fellow, Atlantic Council
 Pedro Noguera (A.B. 1981, A.M. 1982) – Dean, USC Rossier School of Education
 Bina Venkataraman (A.B. 2002) – Director of Global Policy Initiatives, Broad Institute
Noah Wardrip-Fruin (Ph.D. 2006) – Professor of Computational Media, University of California, Santa Cruz

Science, technology and innovation
 Willis Adcock (Ph.D. 1948) — chemist, professor of electrical engineering, grew silicon boules for construction of the first silicon transistor at Texas Instruments
 Katherine L. Adams (A.B. 1986) – General Counsel and Senior Vice President of Legal and Global Security, Apple Inc.
Zachariah Allen (1813) – Inventor of the steam engine automatic cut-off valve
 Seth Berkley (Sc.B. 1978, M.D. 1981) – CEO of GAVI, founder and former President and CEO of the International AIDS Vaccine Initiative
 John Seely Brown (A.B. 1962) – inventor of spellcheck
 Walter Guyton Cady (1895) – physicist and electrical engineer; developed the first quartz crystal oscillator
Bryan Cantrill (B.Sc. 1996) – one of the three authors of DTrace, CTO of Oxide Computer Company, former CTO of Joyent
John H. Crawford (1975) – chief architect, Intel386 and Intel486 microprocessors; co-managed the development of the Pentium microprocessor; Intel Fellow, Enterprise Platforms Group
 John Cumbers (Ph.D. 2011) – British molecular biologist, founder of SynBioBeta
Lisa Gelobter (1991) – developed visual programs such as Shockwave
 Lillian Moller Gilbreth (Ph.D. 1915) – one of the first working female engineers; arguably the first true industrial/organizational psychologist; mother of twelve children as described by the book Cheaper by the Dozen
Morton Gurtin (Ph.D. 1961) – Timoshenko Medal-winning mechanical engineer and mathematical physicist
 Andy Hertzfeld (Sc.B. 1975) – key member of original Apple Macintosh development team; one of the primary software architects of the classic Mac OS
Alexander Lyman Holley (1853) – American inventor, founding member of the American Society of Mechanical Engineers
 Eliot Horowitz (Sc.B. 2003) – co-founder and former CTO of MongoDB
 Mary Lou Jepsen (1987, Ph.D. 1997) – technology executive and inventor, co-founder of One Laptop per Child
Chirinjeev Kathuria (B.Sc. 1988, M.D. 1993) – co-founder and co-chairman of UpHealth Inc, co-founder of Ocean Biomedical
Amy Leventer (Sc.B. 1979) – marine biologist, micropaleontologist, Antarctic researcher
 Adam Leventhal (Sc.B. 2001) – software engineer, one of the three authors of DTrace
David J. Lipman (A.B.) – Director, National Center for Biotechnology Information
Hilary Mason – data scientist, former general manager of machine learning at Cloudera and chief scientist at Bitly
Rebecca Moore (1977) – Director, Google Earth
Meredith Ringel Morris (Sc.B. 2001) –  Director and Principal Scientist, People + AI Research Team, Google Research
Peter Norvig (Sc.B. 1978) – Director of Research, Google Inc.
John Peirce (1856) – inventor who participated in the development of the telephone
 Erin Pettit (Sc.B. 1994) – glaciologist, Antarctic researcher
David Shrier (Sc.B. 1995) – American futurist and author
Ken Silverman (Sc.B. 2000) – writer of the Build engine
Marion Elizabeth Stark (A.B. 1916, A.M. 1979) – one of the first female American mathematics professors
 Gordon Kidd Teal (Ph.D. 1931) – inventor of the commercial silicon transistor
John Tukey (Sc.B. 1936, Sc. M. 1937) – co-developed the Cooley–Tukey fast Fourier transform algorithm; coined the terms bit, byte, software and cepstrum, recipient of the National Medal of Science
 Bob Wallace (Class of 1971) – ninth Microsoft employee, inventor of the term shareware

Space science and exploration 

 Brian Binnie (Sc.B. 1975, Sc.M. 1976) – test pilot, privately funded experimental spaceplane SpaceShipOne
 James B. Garvin (Sc.B. 1978, Sc.M. 1981, Ph.D. 1984) – Chief Scientist, NASA Mars and lunar exploration programs
 David Grinspoon (Sc.B. 1982) – astrobiologist, senior scientist at the Planetary Science Institute
 Wesley Huntress (Sc.B. 1964) – president, The Planetary Society
 Byron K. Lichtenberg (Sc.B. 1969) – NASA astronaut
 Sarah Milkovich (Sc.M. 2002, Ph.D. 2005) – Lead of Science Operations for the Mars 2020 rover at the Jet Propulsion Laboratory
 Jessica Meir (A.B. 1999) – NASA astronaut; one of two women to participate in the first all-female spacewalk
 Lynn J. Rothschild (Ph.D. 1985) – evolutionary biologist and astrobiologist at NASA's Ames Research Center Thomas O. Paine (A.B. 1942) – third Administrator of NASA, oversaw first seven Apollo crewed missions
 Ellen Stofan (Ph.D. 1989) – NASA Chief Scientist (2013–2016), John and Adrienne Mars Director, National Air and Space Museum
 Suzanne Smrekar (B.Sc. 1984) – Deputy Principal Investigator for the Mars InSight lander
 Paul Spudis (Sc.M. 1977) – noted lunar scientist associated with the NASA Office of Space Science
 Winslow Upton (Sc.B. 1875) – astronomer, director of Ladd Observatory
 George Wallerstein (Sc.B. 1951) – astronomer, winner of the Henry Norris Russell Lectureship
 Maria Zuber (Ph.D. 1986) – Principal Investigator of the Jet Propulsion Laboratory's Gravity Recovery and Interior Laboratory (GRAIL) mission

Government, law and public policy

Governors 
 Philip Allen (A.B. 1803) – 22nd Governor of Rhode Island (1851–1853), U.S. Senator, Rhode Island (1853–1859) 
Oliver Ames (1851–1853) – 35th Governor of Massachusetts (1887–1890)
 Henry B. Anthony (A.B. 1833) – 21st Governor of Rhode Island (1849–1851), U.S. Senator, Rhode Island (1859–1884), President pro tempore of the U.S. Senate
 Augustus O. Bourn (1855) – 36th Governor of Rhode Island (1883–1885)
Donald Carcieri (A.B. 1965) – 73rd Governor of Rhode Island (2003–2011)
 Norman S. Case (A.B. 1908) – 56th Governor of Rhode Island (1928–1933)
Lincoln Chafee (A.B. 1975) – 74th Governor of Rhode Island (2011–2015), U.S. Senator, Rhode Island
 William Claflin (Class of 1837) – 27th Governor of Massachusetts (1869–1872)
John H. Clifford (1827) – 21st Governor of Massachusetts (1853–1854)
Samuel Cony (1829) – 31st Governor of Maine (1864–1867)
 Elisha Dyer (A.B. 1829) – 25th Governor of Rhode Island (1857–1859)
 Elisha Dyer Jr. – 45th Governor of Rhode Island (1897–1900)
 James Fenner (A.B. 1789) – 7th, 11th, and 17th Governor of Rhode Island (1807–1811, 1824–1831, 1843–1845)
John Brown Francis (A.B. 1808) – 13th Governor of Rhode Island (1833–1838)
 William Gaston (1840) – 29th Governor of Massachusetts (1875–1876) 
Theodore Francis Green (1887) – 57th Governor of Rhode Island (1933–1936); U.S. Senator, D–Rhode Island (1937–1961)
 Maggie Hassan (A.B. 1980) – 81st Governor of New Hampshire (2013–2017); U.S. Senator, D–New Hampshire (2017–)
 James H. Higgins (A.B. 1898) – 50th Governor of Rhode Island (1907–1909)
Charles Evans Hughes (A.B. 1881) – 36th Governor of New York (1907–1910)
 Charles Jackson (A.B. 1917, A.M. 1920) – 18th Governor of Rhode Island (1845–46)
 Piyush "Bobby" Jindal (Sc.B. 1992) – 55th Governor of Louisiana (2008–2016)
 Otto Kerner Jr. (1930) – 33rd Governor of Illinois – (1961–1968)
Samuel Ward King – 15th Governor of Rhode Island (1839–1843)
Frank Licht (A.B. 1938) – 67th Governor of Rhode Island (1969–1973)
 William L. Marcy (A.B. 1808) – Justice of New York State Supreme Court (1829); 11th Governor of New York (1833–1839); U.S. Secretary of War (1845–1849); U.S. Senator from New York; U.S. Secretary of State (1853–1857) 
 Jack Markell (1982) – 18th United States Ambassador to the OECD, 73rd Governor of Delaware (2009–2017) 
 Marcus Morton (A.B. 1804, A.M 1807) – U.S. Congressman, Massachusetts (1817–1821), 16th & 18th Governor of Massachusetts (1825, 1840–1844) 
 Pendleton Murrah (1848) – 10th Governor of Texas (1863–1865) 
 Philip W. Noel (1954) – 68th Governor of Rhode Island (1973–1977) 
 Robert E. Quinn (1915) – 58th Governor of Rhode Island (1937–1939), Judge for the Rhode Island Superior Court
 Edward C. Stokes (1883) – 32nd Governor of New Jersey (1905–1908) 
 John Milton Thayer (1841) – 2nd Governor of Wyoming Territory (1875–1878) and 6th Governor of Nebraska (1887–1892)
David Rogerson Williams (1792–1795) – 45th Governor of South Carolina (1814–1816)
Jared W. Williams (A.B. 1818) – 21st Governor of New Hampshire (1847–1849)
 William D. Williamson (1804) – 2nd Governor of Maine (1821–1821), U.S. Congressman, Maine (1821–1823)

Legislators

United States senators 
 Philip Allen (A.B. 1803) – U.S. Senator, Rhode Island (1853–1859), Governor of Rhode Island (1851–1853) 
 Henry B. Anthony (A.B. 1833) – U.S. Senator, Rhode Island (1859–1884), President pro tempore of the United States Senate (1875–1875), Governor of Rhode Island (1849–1851) 
 Samuel G. Arnold (A.B. 1841) – U.S. Senator from Rhode Island 
 James Burrill Jr. (A.B. 1788) – U.S. Senator from Rhode Island 
 Lincoln Chafee (A.B. 1975) – U.S. Senator, Rhode Island (1999–2007); Governor of Rhode Island (2011–2015) 
 John Hopkins Clarke (A.B. 1809) – U.S. Senator from Rhode Island 
 Nathan F. Dixon I (A.B. 1799) – U.S. Senator, Rhode Island 
 Nathan F. Dixon III (A.B. 1869) – U.S. Senator from Rhode Island 
 James Fenner (A.B. 1789) – U.S. Senator from Rhode Island 
 Dwight Foster (A.B. 1774) – U.S. Senator from Massachusetts 
 Lafayette S. Foster (A.B. 1828) – U.S. Senator, Connecticut (1855–1867), President pro tempore of the Senate (1865–1867) 
 Theodore Foster (A.B. 1770) – U.S. Senator from Rhode Island 
 John Brown Francis (A.B. 1808) – U.S. Senator from Rhode Island
 Theodore F. Green (A.B. 1887) – U.S. Senator, Rhode Island (1937–1961) 
 Maggie Hassan (A.B. 1980) – 81st Governor of New Hampshire (2013–2017); U.S. Senator, D–New Hampshire (2017–)
 Nathaniel P. Hill (A.B. 1856) – U.S. Senator, Colorado (1879–1885) 
 John Holmes (A.B. 1796) – U.S. Congressman, Massachusetts (1817–1820), U.S. Senator, Maine (1820–1827, 1829–1833)
 Jeremiah B. Howell (A.B. 1789) – U.S. Senator, Rhode Island (1811–1817) 
 William Hunter (A.B. 1791) – U.S. Senator, Rhode Island (1811–1821) 
 Edward L. Leahy (A.B.) – U.S. Senator, Rhode Island (1949–1950)
 Henry F. Lippitt (A.B. 1878) – U.S. Senator, Rhode Island (1911–1917) 
 William L. Marcy (A.B. 1808) – U.S. Senator, New York (1831–1833) 
 Blair Moody (A.B. 1922) – U.S. Senator, Michigan (1951–1952)
John Ruggles (A.B. 1813) – U.S. Senator from Maine (1835–1841) 
 Frederic M. Sackett (1890) – U.S. Senator, Kentucky (1924–1930), U.S. Ambassador to Germany (1930–1933) 
 John Milton Thayer (1841) – U.S. Senator, Nebraska (1867–1871)
Jared W. Williams (A.B. 1818) – U.S. Senator, New Hampshire (1853–1854); U.S. Congressman, New Hampshire (1837–1841); 21st Governor of New Hampshire (1847–1849)

Members of the United States House of Representatives 
 Benjamin Adams (A.B. 1788) – U.S. Congressman, Massachusetts (1816–1821)
Jeremiah Bailey (1795) – U.S. Congressman, Maine (1835–1837)
John Bailey (1807) – U.S. Congressman, Massachusetts (1824–1831)
John Baldwin (A.B. 1797) – U.S. Congressman, Connecticut (1825–1829) 
 Gideon Barstow (1803) – U.S. Congressman, Massachusetts (1821–1823)
William Baylies (1795) – U.S. Congressman, Massachusetts (1809–1809, 1813–1817, 1833–1835)
William H. Bates (1940) – U.S. Congressman, Massachusetts (1950–1969) 
Barnabas Bidwell – U.S. Congressman, Massachusetts (1805 –1807) 
William Daniel Brayton – U.S Congressman, Rhode Island (1857–1861) 
Franklin E. Brooks (1883) – U.S. Congressman, Colorado (1903–1907)
George H. Browne (1840) – U.S Congressman, Rhode Island (1861–1863) 
Tristam Burges (A.B. 1796) – U.S Congressman, Rhode Island (1825–1835) 
 David Cicilline (A.B. 1983) – first openly gay mayor of a state capital–Providence, Rhode Island; U.S Congressman, Rhode Island (2011–).
 Gil Cisneros (M.A. 2015) – U.S. Congressman, California (2019–2021), 10th Under Secretary of Defense for Personnel and Readiness
 William Claflin – U.S. Congressman, Massachusetts (1877 –1881) 
Stephen A. Cobb (1858) – U.S. Congressman, Kansas (1873–1875)
Howard A. Coffin (1901) – U.S. Congressman, Michigan (1947–1949) 
 Samuel S. Cox (1846) – U.S. Congressman, Ohio, New York, U.S. ambassador to the Ottoman Empire
 Samuel L. Crocker (1822) – U.S. Congressman, Massachusetts (1853–1855) 
Robert Lee Davis – U.S. Congressman, Pennsylvania (1932–1933)
Nathan F. Dixon II (1833) – U.S Congressman, Rhode Island (1849–1851, 1863–1871)
Job Durfee (A.B. 1813) – U.S Congressman, Rhode Island (1821–1825)
 Samuel Eddy (1787) – U.S Congressman, Rhode Island (1819–1825), Chief Justice of the Rhode Island Supreme Court (1827–1835) 
 Frederick D. Ely (1859) – U.S. Congressman, Massachusetts (1885–1887)
James Ervin (1797) U.S. Congressman, South Carolina (1817–1821) 
 Horace Everett (A.B. 1797) – U.S. Congressman, Vermont (1829–1843) 
 Thomas Ewing Jr. – U.S. Congressman, Ohio (1877–1881) 
George Fisher (1813) – U.S. Congressman, New York (1829–1830)
Dwight Foster (A.B. 1774) – U.S. Congressman, Massachusetts (1793–1800)
 George B. Francis (1904) – U.S. Congressman, New York (1917–1919) 
Daniel L. D. Granger (1874) – U.S Congressman, Rhode Island (1903–1909)
Julian Hartridge (1848) – U.S. Congressman, Georgia (1875–1879) 
 Nathaniel Hazard (1792) – U.S Congressman, Rhode Island (1819–1820) 
Aaron Hobart (1805) – U.S. Congressman, Massachusetts (1820–1827) 
Thomas Jenckes (1838) – U.S. Congressman, Massachusetts (1859–1863) 
 Piyush "Bobby" Jindal (Sc.B. 1992) – U.S. Congressman, Louisiana (2004–2008) 
 George Gordon King (1825) – U.S Congressman, Rhode Island (1849–1853)
Oscar Lapham (1864) – U.S. Congressman, Rhode Island (1891–1895)
 Dan Maffei (A.B. 1990) – U.S. Congressman, D-New York (2009–2011, 2013–2015) 
 Seth Magaziner (A.B. 2006) – U.S. Congressman, D-Rhode Island (2022–)
Horace Mann (A.B. 1819) – U.S. Congressman, Massachusetts (1848–1853) 
 James Brown Mason (A.B. 1791) – U.S Congressman, Rhode Island (1815–1819) 
 Charles D. Millard (1897) – U.S Congressman, New York (1931–1937) 
Marcus Morton (A.B. 1804, A.M 1807) – U.S. Congressman, Massachusetts (1817–1821); Governor of Massachusetts (1825, 1840–1844) 
 John J. O'Connor (1906) – U.S. Congressman, New York (1923–1939) 
 Richard Olney II (1892) – U.S. Congressman, Massachusetts (1815–1921) 
Dutee Jerauld Pearce (A.B. 1808) – U.S Congressman, Rhode Island (1825–1837) 
Dean Phillips (A.B. 1991) – U.S. Congressman, Minnesota (2019–)
 Henry Kirke Porter (1860) – U.S. Congressman, Pennsylvania (1903–1905) 
 John Reed Jr. (1803) – U.S. Congressman, Massachusetts (1813–1817, 1821–1841) 
Edwin R. Reynolds (1839) – U.S. Congressman, New York (1860–1861) 
Christopher Robinson (1825) – U.S Congressman, Rhode Island (1859–1861) 
Deborah K. Ross (1985) – U.S Congresswoman, North Carolina (2021–)
Jonathan Russell (1791) – U.S. Congressman, Massachusetts (1820) 
Zabdiel Sampson (1803) – U.S. Congressman, Massachusetts (1817–1820) 
 William P. Sheffield, II (1877) – U.S. Congressman, Rhode Island (1909–1911) 
 Solomon Sibley (1794) – first United States Attorney for the Michigan Territory; territorial Delegate to Congress 
Thomas Hale Sill (1804) – U.S. Congressman, Pennsylvania (1826 –1827, 1829 –1831) 
 Edward L. Sittler Jr. (1930) – U.S. Congressman, Pennsylvania, 23rd Congressional District 
 Albert Smith (1813) – U.S. Congressman, Maine (1839–1841)
Henry J. Spooner (1860) – U.S Congressman, Rhode Island (1881–1891)
Walter Russell Stiness (1877) – U.S Congressman, Rhode Island (1815–1823)
Ebenezer Stoddard (1807) – U.S Congressman, Connecticut.
James Tallmadge Jr. (1798) – U.S. Congressman, New York (1817–1819), President of New York University (1830–1846) 
Eli Thayer (1845) – U.S. Congressman, Massachusetts (1857–1861) 
Benjamin Thomas (1830) – U.S. Congressman, Massachusetts (1861–1863) 
 Charles R. Train (1837) – U.S. Congressman, Massachusetts (1859–1863) 
Daniel Wardwell (1811) – U.S. Congressman, New York (1831–1837) 
 Ezekiel Whitman (1795) – U.S. Congressman, Maine (1835–1837) 
David Rogerson Williams (1792–1795) – U.S. Congressman, South Carolina (1811– 1813), Governor of South Carolina (1814–1816) 
Henry Williams (1826) – U.S. Congressman, Massachusetts (1839 –1831, 1843–1845)
William D. Williamson (1804) – U.S. Congressman, Massachusetts (1809–1811) and Maine (1821–1822) 
William Widnall (1926) – U.S. Congressman, New Jersey (1950–1975) 
 John W. Wydler (1947) – U.S. Congressman, New York (1963–1981)

State legislators 
 Sullivan Ballou (Class of 1852) – member of Rhode Island House of Representatives; Major in Rhode Island militia; killed at First Battle of Bull Run
 Brian Benjamin (A.B. 1998) – member of the New York State Senate ( 2017–present), Lieutenant Governor of New York (2021–2022)
Antonio F. D. Cabral (1997) – member of the Massachusetts House of Representatives (1990–present)
 Dan Greenberg (A.B. 1988) – member of the Arkansas General Assembly (2006–2011)
 Elijah Hamlin – member of the Maine House of Representatives (1830–1832)
 Steve Harrison (1990) – member of the West Virginia State Senate (2003–2006) and the West Virginia House of Delegates (1993–2002)
Wingate Hayes (1844) – Speaker of the Rhode Island House of Representatives from 1859 to 1860
Ratcliffe Hicks (1864) – member of the Connecticut House of Representatives (1866–1895), benefactor of the University of Connecticut
 Walter M. D. Kern – politician who served in the New Jersey General Assembly from 1978 to 1990, where he represented the 40th Legislative District.
 Mee Moua (1992) – Minnesota State Senator, first elected Hmong-American politician
 Mark Strama (1990) – member of the Texas House of Representatives
 Austin Volk (1941) – member of the New Jersey General Assembly and mayor of Englewood, New Jersey
 Aaron Regunberg (2012) – member of the Rhode Island House of Representatives and 2018 Democratic candidate for Lieutenant Governor of Rhode Island

Mayors 
Kostas Bakoyannis (A.B. 2000) – Mayor of Athens, Greece (2019–present)
David Cicilline (A.B. 1983) – first openly gay mayor of a state capital–Providence, Rhode Island; U.S Congressman, Rhode Island (2011–).
 Buddy Dyer (Sc.B. 1980) – 32nd Mayor of Orlando, Florida (2003–)
 Henry Loeb (1943) – Mayor of  Memphis, Tennessee (1960–1963, 1968–1971)
 Alex Morse (A.B. 2011) – 44th Mayor of Holyoke, Massachusetts (2012–2021); elected youngest mayor of Holyoke at age 22
 Chelsie J. Senerchia – 26th Mayor of Miami, Florida (1951–1953)
 Solomon Sibley (A.B. 1794) – 1st Mayor of Detroit, Michigan (1806–1806)
 Sumbul Siddiqui (A.B. 2010) – Mayor of Cambridge, Massachusetts (2020–); first Muslim mayor in Massachusetts history
 Samuel Starkweather (1822) – 7th and 15th Mayor of Cleveland (1844–1845, 1857–1858)
 Konstantinos Zervas (Sc.M. 1989) – Mayor of Thessaloniki, Greece (2019–)

Diplomats 
 Willard L. Beaulac (1918) – U.S. Ambassador to Paraguay (1944–1947), Colombia (1947–1951), Cuba (1951–1953), Chile (1953–1956) and Argentina (1956–1960)
W. Randolph Burgess (1912) – U.S. Ambassador to NATO (1957–1961)
 William H. Courtney (Ph.D. 1972) – U.S. Ambassador to Georgia (1995–1997) and Kazakhstan (1992–1994)
 Samuel S. Cox (1846) – U.S. Ambassador to the Ottoman Empire (1885–1886)
Nathaniel Davis (1944) – U.S. Ambassador to Switzerland (1976–1977), Chile (1971-1973), Guatemala (1968–1971), and Bulgaria (1965–1966); Director General of the Foreign Service (1973–1975)
 Roy T. Davis (A.B. 1910) – U.S. Ambassador to Costa Rica (1922–1930), Panama (1930–1933), and Haiti (1953-1957)
 Rosemary DiCarlo (A.B. 1969, M.A. 1971, Ph.D. 1979) – acting U.S. Ambassador to the United Nations (2013)
 Norm Eisen (A.B. 1985) – U.S. Ambassador to the Czech Republic (2011–2014)
 Ana A. Escrogima (A.B. 2001) – nominee for U.S. Ambassador to Oman
 Rufus Gifford (A.B. 1996) – U.S. Ambassador to Denmark (2013–2017), Deputy Campaign Manager for Joe Biden's 2020 presidential campaign, Chief of Protocol of the United States
 John Hay (A.B. 1858) – 37th U.S. Secretary of State (1898–1905)
 Richard Holbrooke (A.B. 1962) – U.S. Ambassador to the United Nations (1999–2001), U.S. Assistant Secretary of State, U.S. Ambassador to Germany (1993–1994) , former Chairman of the Asia Society, member of the Atlantic Council of the United States, Counselor to the Council on Foreign Relations, Founding Chairman of the American Academy in Berlin
 Charles Evans Hughes (A.B. 1881) – 44th U.S. Secretary of State (1921–1925)
Noble Brandon Judah (1904) – U.S. Ambassador to Cuba (1927–1929)
Suzan G. LeVine (A.B. 1993) – U.S. Ambassador to Switzerland and Lichtenstein (2014–2017)
 Frederick Irving (A.B. 1943) – U.S. Ambassador to Iceland (1972–1976)
 Roberta S. Jacobson (A.B. 1982) – U.S. Ambassador to Mexico (2016–2018)
 William L. Marcy (A.B. 1808) – 21st U.S. Secretary of State (1853–1857), 20th United States Secretary of War (1845–1849)
 Anthony Dryden Marshall (1950) – U.S. Consul in Istanbul, 1958–59; U.S. Ambassador to Malagasy Republic, (1969–71), Trinidad and Tobago (1972–74), Kenya (1973–77), Seychelles (1976–77); theatrical producer; felon
 Adam Namm (A.B. 1985) – U.S. Ambassador to Ecuador (2012–2015)
James D. Nealon (A.B. 1980) – U.S. Ambassador to Honduras (2014–2017)
Victoria Nuland (A.B. 1983) – Under Secretary of State for Political Affairs (2021–), U.S. Ambassador to NATO  (2005–2008)
 Richard Olson (A.B. 1981) – U.S. Ambassador to the United Arab Emirates (2008–2011) and Pakistan (2012–2015)
 Richard Olney (A.B. 1856) – 34th U.S. Secretary of State (1895–1897), 40th United States Attorney General (1893–1895)
 Ely Palmer (A.B. 1907) – U.S. Ambassador to Afghanistan (1948)
Nit Phibunsongkhram (A.M. 1967) – Foreign Minister of Thailand (2006–2008), Thai Ambassador to the United States (1996–2000)
 David Pressman (A.B. 1999) – U.S. Ambassador to the United Nations for Special Political Affairs (2014–2017), U.S. Ambassador to Hungary (2022–), co-founder Not on Our Watch
Frederic M. Sackett (A.B. 1890) – U.S. Senator, Kentucky (1924–1930), U.S. Ambassador to Germany (1930–1933)
John J. Sullivan (A.B. 1981) – U.S. Ambassador to Russia (2020–2022), U.S. Deputy Secretary of State (2017–2019), acting U.S. Secretary of State (2018)
 Stephanie S. Sullivan (A.B. 1980) – U.S. Ambassador to Ghana (2019–2022), and Republic of the Congo (2013–2017)
William H. Sullivan (A.B. 1943) – U.S. Ambassador to Laos (1964–1969), the Philippines (1973–1977), and Iran (1977–1979)
W. Stuart Symington (A.B. 1974) – U.S. Ambassador to Nigeria (2016–2019) and Rwanda (2008–2011)
Thomas J. Watson Jr. (A.B. 1937) – U.S. Ambassador to the Soviet Union (1979–1981); 2nd President of IBM (1952–71); 11th national president of the Boy Scouts of America (1964–68); recipient of the 1964 Presidential Medal of Freedom
Henry Wheaton (A.B. 1802) – U.S. Minister to Denmark (1827–1835) and Prussia (1837–1846)
 Curtin Winsor Jr. (A.B. 1961) – U.S. Ambassador to Costa Rica (1983–1985)

Advisors and officials 
 Charles "Chuck" Colson (1953) – chief counsel to Richard Nixon (1969–1973); figured in the Watergate Scandal; founder of Prison Fellowship
 Thomas Corcoran (1922) – member of President Franklin Roosevelt's "brain trust"; guided New Deal legislation; high-powered Washington lobbyist
 Tad Devine (A.B. 1978) – political consultant, senior adviser in Al Gore's 2000 and John Kerry's 2004 Presidential campaigns, chief strategist for Bernie Sanders' 2016 presidential campaign
David F. Duncan (1995) – domestic policy advisor to Bill Clinton and Hillary Clinton; co-originator of the self-medication hypothesis of drug addiction
 John Hay (1858) – U.S. Secretary of State under Presidents William McKinley and Theodore Roosevelt (1898–1905), private secretary and assistant to Abraham Lincoln
 Charles Hill (A.B. 1957) – Senior Lecturer in the Humanities, Brady-Johnson Distinguished Fellow in Grand Strategy, Yale University; former executive aid to former U.S. Secretary of State George P. Shultz; research fellow, Hoover Institution
 E. Howard Hunt (1940) – author, OSS & CIA officer, worked under President Richard Nixon; figured in the Watergate scandal
 Randall Kroszner (A.B. 1984) – member of the Board of Governors of the Federal Reserve System
 Ira Magaziner (1969) – Clinton advisor, current chairman of Clinton AIDS Initiative; co-instigator of Brown's New Curriculum
 Seema Nanda (1992) – United States Solicitor of Labor, CEO of the Democratic National Convention
Annette Nazareth (A.B. 1979) – former Securities and Exchange Commissioner, partner at Davis Polk & Wardell
 Richard Olney (1856) – United States Attorney General (1893–1895), United States Secretary of State (1895–1897)
 David Onek (1991) – candidate for District Attorney of San Francisco
 Thomas Perez (A.B. 1983) – Chair of the Democratic National Committee, former United States Secretary of Labor (2013–2017)
John A. Rizzo (A.B. 1969) – Acting General Counsel and Deputy General Counsel at the Central Intelligence Agency noted for his role in "laying the legal groundwork" for the War on Terror
Tahesha Way (A.B. 1993) – Secretary of State of New Jersey (2018– )
 Janet Yellen (A.B. 1967) – United States Secretary of the Treasury, former Chair of the Federal Reserve, former President of the Federal Reserve Bank of San Francisco; Trefethen Professor of Business Administration and Professor of Economics, University of California, Berkeley

International politicians 

 Junaid Ahmad (A.B.) – Bangladeshi economist, World Bank country director for India
Ichirō Fujisaki – Japanese Ambassador to the United States (2008–12), Japanese Ambassador to the United Nations, Chairman of the Executive Committee of the UN High Commissioner for Refugees (1995–99)
Shigeyuki Goto (A.M. 1984) – Minister of Health, Labour and Welfare of Japan (2021–present)
Martín Guzmán (Ph.D. 2013) – Minister of Economy of Argentina (2019–2022)
Nitya Pibulsonggram (A.M. 1967) – Minister of Foreign Affairs of Thailand (2006–2008)
Nadiem Makarim (2006) – Minister of Education and Culture of Indonesia (2021–present)
Eduardo Montealegre (Sc.B. 1976) – Nicaraguan politician, Deputy to the National Assembly, Minister of Foreign Affairs
 Aeneas Mackay, 15th Lord Reay – Member of the House of Lords Excepted Hereditary (2019–present)
Uttama Savanayana (Sc.B. 1982) – Former Minister of Finance (2019–2020), Industry (2016–2018), and Digital Economy and Society of Thailand (2015-2016)
Tarek Shawki (M.Sc. 1983, M.Sc. 1985, Ph.D. 1985) –  of Egypt
Ijyaraj Singh (Sc.B. 1987) – Member of the Lok Sabha representing Kota (2009–2014)
Julio Velarde (M.A. 1977, Ph.D. 1978) – Chairman of the Central Reserve Bank of Peru (2006–present)

Activists, reformers, and thought leaders 
 Junaid Ahmad (A.B. 1983) – economist; World Bank Country Director for India
 Benjamin Boas (A.B. 2007) – Cool Japan Ambassador to the Cabinet Office of Japan and cultural consultant
 John Bonifaz (1987) – founder, National Voting Rights Institute, recipient of the MacArthur Fellowship
Geoffrey Bowers – plaintiff an early HIV/AIDS discrimination case
 Katherine Chon (Sc.B. 2002) – co-founder and Board President of anti-human trafficking non-profit Polaris Project
 Bhupendranath Datta (M.A. 1914) – Indian revolutionary, sociologist and anthropologist
Sean Eldridge (A.B. 2009) – political activist and former congressional candidate
Derek Ellerman (Sc.B. 2002) – co-founder and Board Chairman of anti-human trafficking non-profit Polaris Project, former Ashoka fellow and current Ashoka Ambassador
 John Dix Fisher (1820) – founder of the Perkins Institution for the Blind—the first school for the blind established in the U.S.
Kathryn S. Fuller (A.B. 1968) – chairman of the Board Ford Foundation former president and CEO of non-governmental organization World Wildlife Fund – U.S. (1989–2005)
 Samuel Gridley Howe (1821) – prominent physician, abolitionist, advocate of education for the blind
 Gene Karpinski (1974) – President, League of Conservation Voters
 Kerry Kennedy (A.B. 1981) – activist, writer; President of Robert F. Kennedy Human Rights; former wife of New York Governor Andrew Cuomo; daughter of Robert F. Kennedy
 Maya Keyes – anarchist and gay rights activist
 Alfie Kohn (A.B. 1979) – proponent of progressive education
Nancy Lublin (1993) — founder of Crisis Text Line
 Horace Mann (A.B. 1819) – educationist; father of American public school education
 Nancy Northup (A.B. 1981) – President, Center for Reproductive Rights
 Nawal M. Nour (A.B. 1988) – physician, founder of the first hospital center in the United States devoted to the medical needs of African women who have undergone FGM, recipient of the MacArthur Fellowship
Michael Parenti (A.M. 1957) – political scientist, social critic, and author
Jesselyn Radack (A.B. 1992) – national security and human rights attorney
Cecile Richards (1980) – President, Planned Parenthood Federation of America
 George Lincoln Rockwell (Class of 1942) – founder of the American Nazi Party; dropped out after sophomore year to join the Navy
 Kenneth Roth (A.B. 1978) – Executive Director of Human Rights Watch (1993–2022)
 Malika Saada Saar (A.B. 1992) – Director of the Human Rights Project for Girls; co-founder of Rebecca Project for Human Rights
Rinku Sen (A.B. 1988) – Co-president of the Women’s March Board of Directors, former executive director of Race Forward
Martha Sharp (A.B. 1926) – Unitarian who aided hundreds of Jews in escaping the Holocaust
Michael Soussan (A.B. 1996) – whistleblower and author
Irving Stowe (A.B. 1936) – founder of Greenpeace

Jurists and attorneys 
Leslie Abrams Gardner (A.B. 1997) – District Judge, United States District Court for the Middle District of Georgia
Asa Aldis (A.B. 1796) – Chief Justice of the Vermont Supreme Court
 Peleg Arnold (A.B.) – Chief Justice of the Rhode Island Supreme Court from 1795 to 1812; represented Rhode Island as a delegate to the Continental Congress in the 1787–1788 session; incorporator of the Providence Society for the Abolition of Slavery in 1790 
 Haiganush R. Bedrosian (A.B. 1965) – Chief Justice, Rhode Island Family Court 
 Francisco Besosa (A.B. 1971) – District Judge, U.S. District Court for the District of Puerto Rico
 Theodore R. Boehm (A.B. 1960) – Justice, Supreme Court of Indiana 
 Charles S. Bradley (A.B. 1838) – Chief Justice, Rhode Island Supreme Court
 George Moulton Carpenter (A.B. 1864) – Federal Judge for United States District Court for the District of Rhode Island
Zachary A. Cunha (A.B. 1998) – United States Attorney for the District of Rhode Island
 Herbert F. DeSimone (A.B. 1910) – Attorney General of Rhode Island and Assistant Secretary of Transportation 
 Job Durfee (A.B. 1813) – Chief Justice, Rhode Island Supreme Court
 Samuel Eddy (1787) – U.S Congressman, Rhode Island (1819–1825), Chief Justice, Rhode Island Supreme Court (1827–1835)
 John Patrick Hartigan (A.B. 1951) – Rhode Island Attorney General, 1933–1939; US District Court, 1940–1951; US Court of Appeals, First Circuit, 1951–1968
Richard Hertling, (A.B. 1982) – Judge, United States Court of Federal Claims
 Charles Evans Hughes (A.B. 1881) – 11th Chief Justice of the United States (1930–1941); Governor of New York (1907–1910); U.S. Secretary of State (1921–1925)
 Charles Evans Hughes Jr. (A.B. 1909) – 20th United States Solicitor General; son of Charles Evans Hughes
 Alfred H. Joslin (A.B. 1936) - Justice of the Rhode Island Supreme Court (1963–1979)
 Patrick C. Lynch (1987) – Rhode Island Attorney General (D)
 Lewis Linn McArthur – Associate Justice of the Oregon Supreme Court
 Theron Metcalf (A.B. 1805) – Associate Justice of the Massachusetts Supreme Judicial Court
 Marcus Morton (1838) – Chief Justice of the Massachusetts Supreme Judicial Court (1882–1890)
 Michael Newdow (Sc.B. 1974) – atheist doctor and lawyer who unsuccessfully argued Elk Grove Unified School District v. Newdow before the U.S. Supreme Court
 Thomas J. Perrelli (A.B. 1988) – former United States Associate Attorney General
Solomon Sibley (A.B. 1794) – Chief Justice, Michigan Supreme Court; first United States Attorney for the Michigan Territory; territorial Delegate to Congress
 Kenneth Starr (M.A. 1969) – former U.S. Solicitor General; former U.S. appeals court judge; special counsel in Bill Clinton impeachment proceedings and namesake of the Starr Report; President of Baylor University
 Norman O. Tietjens (Ph.B. 1925, M.A. 1927) – judge of the United States Tax Court<ref name="Memorial">United States Tax Court, "Memorial Proceedings for the Honorable Norman O. Tietjens, Judge, United States Tax Court, Reports of the Tax Court of the United States, Vol. 81, p. iii-xxi.</ref> 
 Ojetta Rogeriee Thompson (A.B. 1973) – federal judge on the United States Court of Appeals for the First Circuit and former Rhode Island Superior Court judge
William Tong (A.B. 1995) – Attorney General of Connecticut (2019–)
 Anne Rachel Traum (A.B. 1991) – Judge of the United States District Court for the District of Nevada
 Craig Waters (A.B. 1979) – communications counsel to the Florida Supreme Court

Business

Lawrence D. Ackman (1960) – real estate entrepreneur, father of billionaire Bill Ackman
Giovanni Alberto Agnelli (1986) – heir apparent and designated future chairman of the Fiat group
Akash Ambani (A.B. 2013) – Director of Jio and Reliance Retail; eldest son of Mukesh Ambani and Nita Ambani
George S. Barrett (A.B. 1977) – CEO of Cardinal Health (2009–2017)
John Berylson (A.B. 1975) – American investor
Marvin Bower (Sc.B. 1925) – co-founder of McKinsey & Company
Aneel Bhusri (Sc.B. 1988) – billionaire, co-founder and CEO of Workday
Alfred S. Bloomingdale (1938) – co-founder and President, Diners Club International
 Orlando Bravo (1970) - first Puerto Rican billionaire businessman
 Willard C. Butcher (1948) – former chairman and CEO, Chase Manhattan Bank
Adam Cahan (A.B. 1993) – former Senior Vice President of Mobile and Emerging Products, Yahoo!
Arthur L. Carter (1953) – investor, namesake of the Arthur L. Carter Journalism Institute at New York University
 Lisa Caputo (A.B. 1986) – chief marketing officer, Citigroup
 Finn M. W. Caspersen (A.B. 1963) – financier, chairman and chief executive of the Beneficial Corporation
John S. Chen (Sc.B. 1978) – chairman and CEO of BlackBerry Limited
Chung Yong-jin (A.B. 1994) – South Korean billionaire, vice chairman and CEO of Shinsegae Group
Glenn Creamer (A.B. 1984) – billionaire, Senior Managing Director of Providence Equity Partners 
 Dan DiMicco (B.Sc. 1972) – CEO (2000–12) and chairman (2006–12) of Nucor 
Tanya Dubash (A.B. 1991) – Indian businesswoman
David Ebersman (A.B. 1991) – former Chief Financial Officer of Facebook, Inc.; founder, Lyra Health
 Donna M. Fernandes (Sc.B 1981) President and CEO, Buffalo Zoo 2000–2017
Dylan Field (Class of 2013½) – founder and CEO of Figma
Devin Finzer (B.Sc. 2013) – billionaire, CEO and co-founder of OpenSea
 George M. C. Fisher (Sc. M. 1964, Ph.D. 1966) – former CEO of Motorola and Eastman Kodak Company
 Tim Forbes (1976) – Chief Operating Officer, Forbes
Sidney Frank (Class of 1942) – billionaire founder of Grey Goose and Jägermeister
 Tom Gardner (A.B. 1990) – co-founder and co-chairman of the Motley Fool
Kenneth Gaw (1992) – Hong Kong businessman
Charles Giancarlo (B.Sc. 1979) – chairman and CEO of Pure Storage, former chief technology officer at Cisco Systems
 Jeffrey W. Greenberg (A.B. 1973) – chairman and CEO of Marsh & McLennan Companies
 Theresia Gouw (Sc.B. 1990) – investor, wealthiest female venture capitalist in the United States
Ross Greenburg (1977) – president of HBO Sports
 Oliver Haarmann (1990) – founding partner of Searchlight Capital Partners
James Harmon (A.B. 1957) – investor; President and CEO, Export–Import Bank of the United States (1997-2001)
Walter Hoving (Ph.B. 1920) – CEO of Tiffany & Co.
 Bradley S. Jacobs (Class of 1979) – billionaire founder and CEO of XPO Logistics
 Nina Jacobson (A.B. 1987) – former president, Walt Disney Studios Motion Pictures
Parth Jindal (A.B. 2012) – managing director of JSW Cement, son of Sajjan Jindal
Craig Kallman (A.B. 1987) – chairman and CEO of Atlantic Records Group
Ray Kassar (1948) – former CEO of Atari
 Paul Kazarian (M.A. 1980) – billionaire investor
Dara Khosrowshahi (Sc.B. 1991) – CEO of Uber, former CEO of Expedia Group
İpek Kıraç (2007, M.P.H. 2011) – Turkish billionaire heiress and businesswoman
Beth Kobliner (A.B. 1986) – personal finance commentator
Randy Komisar (A.B. 1976) – co-founder of Claris, former CEO of LucasArts
Jonathan Klein (A.B. 1980) – former president of CNN/US
Steph Korey (A.B. 2009) – founder of Away
Liz Lange (A.B. 1988) – founder of Liz Lange Maternity
 Debra L. Lee (A.B. 1976) – chairman and CEO of Black Entertainment Television
 Gordon Macklin (A.B. 1950) – former president and CEO, NASDAQ
 Nadiem Makarim (A.B. 2006) – founder of Gojek, current Minister of Education and Culture of Indonesia
Robert Marcus (A.B. 1987) – former chairman and CEO of Time Warner Cable
Brian Moynihan (A.B. 1981) – president and CEO, Bank of America
Jonathan M. Nelson (A.B. 1977) – billionaire, investor, founder of Providence Equity Partners
 Karan Paul (1992) – chairman, Apeejay Surrendra Group
Steven Price (Sc.B. 1984) – co-founder of Townsquare Media, and minority owner of the Atlanta Hawks
George Pyne (1988) – founder and CEO of Bruin Sports Capital
 Sridhar Ramaswamy (Ph.D. 1995) – former Senior Vice President of Advertising and Commerce, Google
Ajit Ranade (A.M., Ph.D. 1997) – Chief Economist with the Aditya Birla Group
 Steven Rattner (A.B. 1974) – Deputy Chairman and Deputy CEO, Lazard Frères & Co.
 William R. Rhodes (A.B. 1957) – Senior Vice Chairman, Citigroup
 Stephen Robert (A.B. 1962), chairman and CEO of Oppenheimer & Co. (1983–1997), Chancellor of Brown University (1998–2007)
 John D. Rockefeller Jr. (A.B. 1897) – financer, philanthropist, son of John D. Rockefeller, and builder of Rockefeller Center
 Tom Rothman (A.B. 1976) – president, 20th Century Fox Film Group
 Tom Scott (A.B. 1989) – co-founder of Nantucket Nectars, with Tom First
 John Sculley (A.B. 1961) – president of PepsiCo (1977–1983); CEO of Apple Computer (1983–1993)
Josh Silverman (A.B. 1991) – CEO of Etsy (2017–) and Skype (2008–10); founder of Evite
Rashmi Sinha (Ph.D. 1998) – co-founder and CEO of SlideShare
 Lawrence M. Small (A.B. 1963) – president of Fannie Mae; secretary of the Smithsonian Institution
 Orin R. Smith (1957) – chairman and CEO, Engelhard (1999–2001)
 Barry Sternlicht (A.B. 1982) – co-founder and CEO of Starwood Capital Group, co-founder of Starwood
Jeff Stibel (Sc.M. 1999) – entrepreneur, founder of Bryant Stibel
 Jeffrey Swartz (A.B. 1982) – former CEO of Timberland
Melvin Swig (A.B. 1939) – real estate developer and philanthropist
Ted Turner (Class of 1960) – billionaire founder of CNN and Turner Broadcasting
Amelia Warren Tyagi (A.B. 1993) – businesswoman, author; daughter of Massachusetts senator Elizabeth Warren
 Thomas J. Watson Jr. (1937) – president and CEO of IBM (1956–1971); U.S. Ambassador to the Soviet Union (1979–1981)
 Gus Wenner (2012) – CEO of Rolling Stone Jochen Wermuth (A.M. 1992) – German investor, founder and Chief Investment Officer of Wermuth Asset Management
Melanie Whelan (1999) – CEO of SoulCycle (2015–2019)
Meredith Whitney (A.B. 1992) – equity research analyst notable for her prediction of the financial crisis of 2007–2009
 Andrew Yang (A.B. 1996) – founder of Venture for America (VFA), 2020 U.S. Democratic presidential candidate 
Nancy Zimmerman (A.B. 1985) – hedge fund manager, co-founder of Bracebridge Capital

Journalism
 Leroy F. Aarons (A.B. 1955) – journalist; founder of the National Lesbian and Gay Journalists Association
Jim Axelrod (A.M. 1989) – Chief White House correspondent, CBS News
Rebecca Ballhaus (A.B. 2013) – Pulitzer Prize–winning journalist
 Chris Berman (A.B. 1977) – ESPN host and anchor
 Martin Bernheimer (1958) – Pulitzer Prize–winning music critic
Duncan B. Black, aka Atrios (Ph.D. 1999) – political blogger
 Elizabeth Bruenig (2014–2015) – opinion writer at The New York Times and formerly The Washington Post  
Robert Conley (1953) – founding member and former General Manager of NPR; creator and original host of All Things Considered; former New York Times front-page correspondent; National Geographic writer; reporter and anchor for NBC and the Huntley-Brinkley Report Gareth Cook (A.B. 1991) – Pulitzer Prize for Explanatory Reporting, Boston Globe, for writing about stem cell research
 David Corn (1981) – Washington, D.C. bureau chief for Mother JonesDana Cowin (A.B. 1982) – Editor-in-Chief of Food & Wine Lyn Crost (A.B. 1938) – World War II correspondent and author, Honor by Fire:Japanese Americans at War in Europe and the Pacific Adrian Dearnell (A.B. 1994) – Franco-American financial journalist, CEO and founder of EuroBusiness Media
Larry Elder (A.B. 1974) – columnist; radio personality; TV talk show host, The Larry Elder Show; author; unsuccessful Republican candidate in the 2021 California gubernatorial recall election
 Katherine Eban (A.B. 1989) – investigative journalist
Chip Giller (A.B. 1993) – environmentalist, founder of Grist Ira Glass (A.B. 1982) – host and producer, National Public Radio, This American Life Jerry Green (A.B. 1950) – sports journalist, member of the Pro Football Hall of Fame.
 Catherine Gund (A.B. 1988) – documentary filmmaker; activist
 Chris Hayes (A.B. 2001) – Editor of The Nation and host of All In with Chris Hayes on MSNBC 
 Tony Horwitz (1980) – journalist, Wall Street Journal, winner of the Pulitzer Prize for National Reporting
 A. J. Jacobs (1990) – journalist and author, The Know-It-All: One Man's Humble Quest to Become the Smartest Person in the World, The Year of Living BiblicallyEdward Davis Jones (Class of 1877) – co-founder of The Wall Street Journal, namesake of the Dow Jones Industrial Average
Sasha Frere-Jones (Class of 1988) – writer, music critic, and musician
John F. Kennedy Jr. (A.B. 1983) – lawyer; journalist; publisher of George magazine; son of President John F. Kennedy; killed in an airplane crash on July 16, 1999
 Glenn Kessler (A.B. 1981) – diplomatic correspondent for The Washington Post Noel King (A.B. 2004) – co-host of Morning Edition and Up FirstHiroko Kuniya (A.B. 1979) – Japanese news anchor
Erik Kuselias (1991) – host of hosts Sportsline and CBS Sports
Sharon LaFraniere (A.B. 1977) – Pulitzer Prize–winning journalist at The New York TimesJosh Levin (2002) – National Editor at SlateIrving R. Levine (1944) – former NBC News correspondent
 Mara Liasson (A.B. 1977) – NPR correspondent
 Bill Lichtenstein (1978) – journalist, documentary filmmaker, president of LCMedia, Inc.; recipient of Guggenheim Fellowship and Peabody Award
 Andrew Marantz (2006) – staff writer at The New YorkerMark Maremont (1980) – senior special writer for the Wall Street Journal; two-time Pulitzer Prize winner
 Josh Marshall (Ph.D. 2003) – Polk Award-winning journalist; founder, Talking Points Memo Matthew Miller (A.B. 1983) – Senior Fellow, Center for American Progress; columnist for Fortune; regular contributor to The New York Times MagazineGeorge Musser (Sc.B. 1988) – author and editor at Scientific American Pamela Paul (A.B. 1993) – opinion columnist, The New York Times, editor of The New York Times Book Review (2013–2022)
Holly Peterson (A.B. 1987) – contributing editor for Newsweek magazine, editor-at-large for Talk magazine, producer for ABC News
Sasha Polakow-Suransky (2001) – deputy editor at Foreign Policy, Rhodes Scholar
Scott Poulson-Bryant (A.B. 2008, originally Class of 1989) – co-founding editor of VIBE Magazine Andrew Revkin (A.B. 1978) – environmental journalist, New York Times; recipient of 2008 Columbia University Journalism School John Chancellor Award
 Quentin Reynolds (1924) – World War II war correspondent.
 James Risen (1977) – journalist for The Intercept; author of two books about the Central Intelligence Agency; broke the 2005 story of warrantless NSA wiretapping; winner of the 2006 Pulitzer Prize for National Reporting
 David S. Rohde (A.B. 1990) – Pulitzer Prize–winning journalist; escaped from 7-month Taliban captivity in 2009
 Kevin Roose (Class of 2009) – technology columnist for The New York TimesAlissa J. Rubin (A.B. 1980) – Pulitzer Prize–winning journalist, Baghdad Bureau chief, The New York TimesMargaret Russell (1980) – Editor-in-Chief, Elle Decor magazine; design judge, Top Design Laura Secor (A.B.) – journalist
Aaron Schatz (1996) – ESPN NFL analyst, founder of Football Outsiders
 Kathryn Schulz (A.B. 1996) – Pulitzer Prize–winning journalist, staff writer at The New Yorker Julia Flynn Siler (A.B. 1983) – journalist and nonfiction author
Elissa Silverman (A.B. 1995) – journalist, member of the Council of the District of Columbia at-large (2015–present)
Amy Sohn (A.B. 1995) – columnist, New York magazine; novelist, Run Catch Kiss and Sex and the City: Kiss and Tell Doreen St. Félix (2014) – staff writer at The New YorkerAlison Stewart (A.B. 1988) – host, MSNBC's The Most with Alison Stewart A. G. Sulzberger (A.B. 2003) – publisher, The New York Times; chairman of The New York Times Company
André Leon Talley (A.M. 1973) – Vogue magazine editor-at-large; first African-American male creative director of Vogue; regarded as "fashion icon"
Wallace Terry (A.B. 1959) – African-American journalist, author, and oral historian known for his coverage of Black soldiers in the Vietnam War
 Salamishah Tillet (M.A.T. 1997) - Pulitzer Prize-winning essayist
 Krista Tippett (A.B. 1983) – host, NPR's Speaking of Faith, and creator and host of On Being Larry Tye (A.B. 1977) – journalist
Alex Wagner (A.B. 1999) – host, Alex Wagner Tonight, MSNBC
David Wallace-Wells (A.B. 2004) – opinion columnist, The New York Times; author of The Uninhabitable EarthIvan Watson (A.B. 1997) – senior international correspondent, CNN
Curtis Yarvin (1992) – blogger, political theorist, software engineer, and internet entrepreneur associated with the Dark Enlightenment

Literature
 David Allyn (A.B. 1991) – author, Make Love, Not War, I Can't Believe I Just Did That, playwright, Baptizing Adam Donald Antrim (A.B. 1981) – author, Elect Mr. Robinson for a Better World, The Verificationist, The Hundred Brothers, recipient of the MacArthur Fellowship
 Jacob M. Appel (A.B. 1995) – author, playwright, Arborophilia, Creve Coeur, The Mistress of Wholesome Mona Awad (M.F.A. 2014) – novelist and short story writer
Peter Balakian (Ph.D. 1980) – Pulitzer Prize-winning poet, Ozone Journal Edward Ball (A.B. 1982) – National Book Award-winning nonfiction writer, Slaves in the Family, The Genetic Strand Mark Baumer (M.F.A. 2011) – writer and environmental activist
Josh Bazell (A.B. 1992) – novelist
 Bill Berkson (1957–1959) – poet and critic
Lisa Birnbach (A.B. 1978) – author, The Official Preppy Handbook Kate Bornstein ( Albert Bornstein) (A.B. 1969) – transgender activist, performance artist, playwright, gender theorist, and author
 Jeffrey Carver (A.B. 1971) – science fiction author, Nebula Award finalist
 Andrew Chaikin (A.B. 1978) – author, A Man on the MoonJessamine Chan (2000) – author, The School for Good MothersSusan Cheever (A.B. 1965) – author
 Frank Chipasula (A.M. 1980, Ph.D. 1987) – Malawian writer
 Franny Choi (A.B. 2011) – poet
Mallika Chopra (A.B. 1993) — author and self-help entrepreneur
 Ted Chiang (Sc.B. 1989) – Nebula Award, Locus Award, and Hugo Award-winning science fiction writer; author of Story of Your Life, the basis for the film Arrival Brian Christian (A.B. 2006) – author, The Most Human HumanZinzi Clemmons (A.B. 2007) – author
 Nicole Cooley (A.B. 1988) – poet, Professor of English, Queens College, City University of New York
 Nilo Cruz (M.F.A. 1994) – Pulitzer Prize–winning playwright, Anna in the Tropics Edwidge Danticat (M.F.A. 1993) – American Book Award-winning author, Breath, Eyes, Memory, The Dew Breaker, recipient of the MacArthur fellowship
Cyrus Grace Dunham (2014) – author, A Year Without A Name: A Memoir David Ebershoff (A.B. 1991) – Lambda Literary Award-winning author, The Danish Girl, editor-at-large at Random House, professor at Columbia University
 Jeffrey Eugenides (A.B. 1983) – Pulitzer Prize–winning author, Middlesex, The Virgin Suicides, The Marriage Plot Percival Everett (A.M. 1982) – novelist, poet; Distinguished Professor of English, University of Southern California
 Rudolph Fisher (A.B. 1919, A.M. 1920) – author, musician, physician; a leader of the Harlem Renaissance
 Richard Foreman (A.B. 1959) – playwright/avant-garde theater pioneer; founder, Ontological-Hysteric Theater, recipient of the MacArthur fellowship
 Sam Walter Foss (A.B. 1882) – poet
Sarah Gambito (M.F.A. 1999) – poet; director of creative writing, Fordham University
 Deborah Garrison (A.B. 1986) – poet
 Peter Gizzi (M.F.A. 1991) – poet, professor at the University of Massachusetts Amherst's MFA Program for Poets & Writers
Xochitl Gonzalez (A.B. 1999) – author and screenwriter, Olga Dies Dreaming Jaimy Gordon (A.M. 1972, A.D. 1975) – National Book Award-winning author, Lord of Misrule Andrew Sean Greer (A.B. 1992) – Pulitzer Prize–winning author, Less Jennifer Haley (M.F.A. 2005) – playwright, winner of the 2012 Susan Smith Blackburn Prize
Scott Haltzman (1982, M.D. 1985) – psychiatrist, self-help author
 Jordan Harrison (M.F.A. 2003) – playwright, finalist for the 2015 Pulitzer Prize for Drama
Tony Horwitz (A.B. 1980) – Pulitzer Prize–winning journalist, author of Confederates in the Attic, Blue Latitudes Shelley Jackson (M.F.A. 1994) – hyperfiction writer, author of Patchwork Girl Steven Johnson (A.B. 1990) – writer and popular science author
 Winthrop Jordan (Ph.D. 1960) – American Civil War and racial history writer, winner of the National Book Award and Bancroft Prize
 Gayl Jones (M.A. 1973, Ph.D. 1975) – novelist, poet, and playwright; "literary legend" of Black literature
Zeyn Joukhadar (Ph.D. 2014) – novelist
Bess Kalb (A.B. 2010) – author and television writer
Phil Kaye (A.B. 2010) – poet and spoken word artist
Sarah Kay (A.B. 2010, M.A.T. 2012) – poet and spoken word artist
Jonathan Karp (A.B. 1986) – publisher, CEO of Simon & Schuster
 Caroline Kepnes (A.B. 1999) – American author and screenwriter, You, Hidden Bodies, ProvidenceAlexandra Kleeman (A.B. 2007) – writer
T. E. D. Klein (A.B. 1969) – horror fiction writer and magazine editor
 Caroline Knapp (A.B. 1981) – essayist and author, Drinking: A Love Story Richard Kostelanetz (A.B.1962) – cultural historian, fictioner, poet, experimental writer, critic of avant-garde arts and artists, anthologist
 Geoffrey A. Landis (Ph.D. 1988) – Nebula Award and Hugo Award-winning scientist-writer and hard science fiction author
 Reif Larsen (A.B 2003) – professor at Columbia University; author, The Selected Works of T.S. SpivetMarie Myung-Ok Lee (A.B. 1986) – author and essayist
 Joanne Leedom-Ackerman (A.M. 1969) – author and journalist
Ben Lerner (A.B. 2001, M.F.A. 2003) – poet, author of Angle of Yaw, Leaving the Atocha Station, 10:04 and The Lichtenberg Figures, recipient of the MacArthur fellowship
 Steven Levenson (A.B. 2006) – author, Dear Evan Hansen, winner of the 2017 Tony Award for Best Book of a Musical
David Levithan (A.B. 1993) – author, Boy Meets Boy, Will Grayson, Will Grayson, Nick and Norah's Infinite Playlist Alan Levy (A.B. 1952) – author
 David Lipsky (A.B. 1987) – author, Three Thousand Dollars, The Art Fair, Absolutely American Sam Lipsyte (A.B. 1990) – author, Home Land, Venus Drive, The Fun Parts Lois Lowry (Class of 1958) – Newbery Medal-winning author, The Giver Thomas Mallon (A.B. 1973) – author, Henry and Clara, Bandbox, Dewey Defeats Truman, Two Moons Ben Marcus (M.F.A. 1991) – author, The Age of Wire and String, Notable American Women Alex McAulay (A.B.) – author, Bad Girls, Lost Summer, Oblivion Road, Shelter Me Emily Arnold McCully (A.B. 1961) – Caldecott Award-winning children's author, Mirette on the High Wire Mark C. McGarrity (A.B. 1966) – wrote crime fiction under the name Bartholomew Gill
 Roland Merullo (A.B. 1975, A.M.) – author
 S. J. Perelman (Class of 1925) – humorist, The New Yorker; author; Academy Award-winning screenwriter, Around the World in Eighty Days Nathaniel Philbrick (A.B. 1978) – nonfiction writer; National Book Award winner, author of In the Heart of the SeaMarilynne Robinson (A.B. 1966) – Pulitzer Prize and Orange Prize-winning author, Gilead, Housekeeping, Home Ariel Sabar (A.B. 1993) – author, National Book Critics Circle Award 2009 for My Father's Paradise Joanna Scott (M.A. 1985) – author, recipient of the MacArthur Foundation Fellowship and the Lannan Literary Award for Fiction
 Dana Schwartz (A.B. 2015) – author
 David Shenk (A.B. 1988) – author, The Forgetting, Data Smog, The Immortal Game Reginald Shepherd (M.F.A. 1988) – poet and author
 Daniel Sherrell (A.B. 2013) – author and climate organizer
David Shields (A.B. 1978) – author, Reality Hunger Scott Snyder (A.B. 1998) – author of the story collection Voodoo Heart and writer of Vertigo Comics's ongoing original series American Vampire Gustaf Sobin (A.B. 1957) – poet, expatriate
Brian Kim Stefans (M.F.A. 2006) – poet, professor of English at UCLA
Nathanael West (Ph.B. 1924) – author, Miss Lonelyhearts, The Day of the Locust Meg Wolitzer (A.B. 1981) – author, The Wife, The Interestings, The Position Adelle Waldman (A.B. 1988) – author, The Love Affairs of Nathaniel P.Afaa M. Weaver (M.F.A. 1987) – poet, author, and editor
Sherley Anne Williams (A.M. 1972) – poet and novelist
Kevin Young (M.F.A. 1996) – poetry editor, New Yorker; director of the National Museum of African American History and Culture
Joshua M. Zeitz (A.M. 1998, Ph.D. 2002) – historian
C Pam Zhang (2011) – author, How Much of These Hills Is Gold Medicine and public health 

 Samuel Warren Abbott (A.M. 1858) – first medical examiner and first secretary of Massachusetts's first state board of health from 1886 to 1904
 Justin M. Andrews (Ph.B. 1923) – Director of the Centers for Disease Control and Prevention, 2nd Director of the National Institute of Allergy and Infectious Diseases
 Aaron T. Beck (A.B. 1942) – "father of cognitive behavioral therapy"; founder of the Beck Institute for Cognitive Behavior Therapy at the University of Pennsylvania; winner of the Lasker Award
Seth Berkley (Sc.B. 1978, M.D. 1981) – CEO of GAVI, founder and former President and CEO of the International AIDS Vaccine Initiative
Tom Catena (A.B. 1986) – Catholic medical missionary working in central Sudan
 William A. Catterall (A.B. 1968) – Chair and Professor of Pharmacology, University of Washington School of Medicine, ForMemRS
Charles V. Chapin (A.B. 1876) – Providence Superintendent of Health (1884–1932), pioneer in public health research and practice, first president of the American Epidemiological Society, professor of physiology at Brown
 Lynda Chin (A.B. 1988) – Department Chair and Professor of Genomic Medicine, University of Texas MD Anderson Cancer Center; Scientific Director, MD Anderson Institute for Applied Cancer Science
 James J. Cimino (B.Sc. 1977) – Professor of Medicine and Director, Informatics Institute, University of Alabama at Birmingham School of Medicine
George E. Coghill (A.B. 1896, Ph.D. 1902) – anatomist
 Solomon Drowne (A.B. 1773) – physician, academic, and surgeon during the American Revolution
Nora Groce (Ph.D.) – Leonard Cheshire Chair of Disability and Inclusive Development, Institute of Epidemiology & Health, University College London
Andrew C. Hecht (1989) – Chief of Spine Surgery, Mount Sinai Hospital; Associate Professor of Orthopaedic Surgery and of Neurologic Surgery, Icahn School of Medicine
Insoo Hyun (Ph.D. 1998) – Professor of Bioethics, Case Western Reserve University School of Medicine; Senior Lecturer, Harvard Medical School
Judith V. Jordan (1965) – co-director, Jean Baker Miller Institute; Assistant Professor of Psychology, Harvard Medical School
Mark L. Kahn (A.B. 1984, M.D. 1987) – Edward S. Cooper, M.D./Norman Roosevelt and Elizabeth Meriwether McLure Professor of Medicine, Perelman School of Medicine at the University of Pennsylvania
Philip Kantoff (1976, M.D. 1979) – former Chairman of Medicine at Memorial Sloan Kettering Cancer Center, Jerome and Nancy Kohlberg Professor of Medicine Emeritus at Harvard Medical School
 William Williams Keen (A.B. 1859) – first American brain surgeon
 Linda Liau (A.B., S.B. 1987) – W. Eugene Stern Chair of the Department of Neurosurgery, David Geffen School of Medicine at UCLA
 Lloyd B. Minor (Sc.B. 1979, M.D. 1982) – Carl and Elizabeth Naumann Dean, Stanford University School of Medicine; former provost, Johns Hopkins University
Christine Montross (M.D. 2006, M.M.Sc. 2007) – Associate Professor of Psychiatry and Human Behavior, Alpert Medical School at Brown University
Nawal M. Nour (A.B. 1984) – Chair of the Department of Obstetrics and Gynecology, Brigham and Women's Hospital; Associate Professor, Harvard Medical School
Michael Polydefkis (B.Sc. 1988) – Director, Cutaneous Nerve Lab, Johns Hopkins University School of Medicine; Howard Hughes Medical Institute Investigator
Megan Ranney (M.P.H. 2010) – Warren Alpert Endowed Professor in the Department of Emergency Medicine, Alpert Medical School; Academic Dean, Brown University School of Public Health
Joan Reede (Sc.B. 1976) – physician, Dean for Diversity and Community Partnership, Harvard Medical School
 Griffin P. Rodgers (Sc.B. 1976, M.M.Sc. & M.D. 1979) – Director of the National Institute of Diabetes and Digestive and Kidney Diseases
 Matthew Sacchet (A.B. 2010) – Assistant Professor, Department of Psychiatry, Harvard Medical School
Sally Satel (M.D. 1984) – Lecturer in Psychiatry, Yale School of Medicine
 Erica Schwartz (Sc.B. 1994, M.D. 1998) – Deputy Surgeon General of the United States (2019-2021)
 Manny Sethi (A.B. 2000) – physician, president and founder of the non-profit Healthy Tennessee
Neel Shah (Sc.B. 2004, M.D. 2009) – Executive Director of Costs of Care, Assistant Professor at Harvard Medical School

Military
 John F. Aiso (1931) – highest-ranking Japanese American in the U.S. Army during World War II, first Japanese American judge in the contiguous U.S.
William C. Chase (A.B. 1916) – Major General during World War II
G. Edward Buxton (Ph.B. 1902) – commanding officer of Sergeant Alvin C. York; first assistant director of the OSS
Thomas Ewing Jr. (Class of 1856) – Union Army general during the American Civil War, first chief justice of Kansas
Ployer Peter Hill (B.Sc. 1916) – test pilot, namesake of Hill Air Force Base in Utah
 James Mitchell Varnum (A.B. 1769) – General in the Continental Army during the American Revolutionary War and justice of the Supreme Court of the Northwest Territory

Performing arts
 Music 
 Sean Altman (A.B. 1983) – founding tenor member of Rockapella, known for the theme song of Where in the World is Carmen Sandiego? Charles Ansbacher (1965) – founder and conductor of the Boston Landmarks Orchestra
 MC Paul Barman (A.B. 1997) – cult rapper
 Marco Beltrami (Sc.B. 1988) – two-time Academy Award-nominated film score composer, Scream (1996), Resident Evil (2002), Terminator 3: Rise of the Machines (2003), Hellboy (2004), Live Free or Die Hard (2007), 3:10 to Yuma (2007), Max Payne (2008), Mesrine (2008), The Hurt Locker (2009), The Wolverine (2013), Warm Bodies (2013), World War Z (2013), Free Solo (2018), Ford v Ferrari (2019), and the video game Fortnite  
 Clare Burson (1997) – singer-songwriter
 David Buskin (A.B 1965) – singer-songwriter (Modern Man), jingle composer, Clio Award winner (1983)
 Julia Cafritz – musician, known for Pussy Galore
 Wendy Carlos (A.B. 1962) – composer and electronic musician, Switched-On Bach (1968); film score composer, A Clockwork Orange (1971), Tron (1982)
 Mary Chapin Carpenter (A.B. 1981) – country singer-songwriter
 Chubb Rock – rapper and radio host
 Joel Cohen (A.B. 1963) – director of the Boston Camerata
 Alvin Curran (A.B. 1960) – avant-garde composer
 Catie Curtis (1987) – contemporary folk singer-songwriter
 Dave Dederer (A.B.) – guitarist, singer, and founding member of rock band The Presidents of the United States of America
 Shelby Gaines (1991) – musician and artist
Tucker Halpern (2013) – musician and DJ, one half of electronic pop group Sofi Tukker
 Dhani Harrison (2001) – son of George Harrison, composer, guitarist
Sophie Hawley-Weld (2014) – musician, one half of electronic pop group Sofi Tukker
 Lili Haydn (1992) – singer-songwriter, violinist
Lingua Ignota (M.F.A. 2016) – multidisciplinary artist and instrumentalist
Nicolás Jaar (A.B. 2012) – avant-garde electronic music producer, owner and founder of record label and art house Clown & Sunset
 Gabriel Kahane (2003) – singer-songwriter
Elliott Kerman (Sc.B. 1981) – founding baritone member of Rockapella
 Tad Kinchla (1995) – bassist for jam band Blues Traveler
 Richard Kostelanetz (A.B. 1962) – electro-acoustic composer (New York City Oratorio, America's Game), writer on innovative musics and musicians
 Damian Kulash (A.B. 1998) – lead singer and founding member of indie rock band OK Go
 Erich Kunzel (1964) – conductor, Cincinnati Pops Orchestra
Lawrence – soul-pop group founded by Clyde Lawrence '15 and Gracie Lawrence (Class of 2020) 
Lisa Loeb (A.B. 1990) – Grammy Award-winning alternative singer-songwriter; first unsigned artist to top the American charts
 The Low Anthem – indie folk band that includes alums Ben Knox Miller (2006), Jeff Prystowsky (2006) and Jocie Adams
 Erin McKeown (2000) – folk singer-songwriter
 Elizabeth Mitchell (1990) – musician, member of indie folk–pop band Ida; played in a band with Lisa Loeb and Duncan Sheik while at Brown
 Will Oldham (Class of 1992) – indie rock/alternative country singer-songwriter who also performs under the names Bonnie 'Prince' Billy and Palace
 Elvis Perkins (1995) – singer-songwriter
 Navah Perlman (A.B. 1992) – concert pianist; daughter of Itzhak Perlman
 Dan Prothero – producer / engineer and owner of Fog City Records
 The Range – DJ and electronic musician
 Sebastian Ruth (A.B. 1997) – violinist, 2010 MacArthur Fellow and faculty member of the Yale School of Music
 Susan Salms-Moss (A.B. 1967) – soprano
 Theodore Shapiro (A.B. 1993) – film score composer, State and Main (2000), Old School (2003), Starsky & Hutch (2004), The Devil Wears Prada (2006), Marley & Me (2008), Tropic Thunder (2008), I Love You, Man (2008), We're the Millers (2013), The Secret Life of Walter Mitty (2013), Ghostbusters (2016),  The Eyes of Tammy Faye (2021), Severance (2022) 
 Duncan Sheik (A.B. 1992) – alternative rock singer-songwriter; top 10 hit for the song "Barely Breathing"; Grammy and two-time Tony Award-winning composer, Spring Awakening Sasha Spielberg (2012) – musician, Wardell; daughter of Steven Spielberg and Kate Capshaw
 Susie Suh (A.B. 2002) – alternative rock singer-songwriter
 Saleka (A.B. 2018) – R&B singer-songwriter; daughter of M. Night Shyamalan
 Jon Spencer – singer and composer, known for Pussy Galore and Boss Hog
 Sally Taylor (1996) – singer-songwriter, daughter of Carly Simon and James Taylor
Gwyneth Walker (A.B. 1967) – composer
J. Mayo Williams (1920) – first African-American producer at a major record label
Jamila Woods, (A.B. 2011) singer, songwriter and poet signed to Jagajaguwar
 ZOX – SideOneDummy recording artist, composed of John Zox '02, Eli Miller '02, Daniel Edinberg '02, and Spencer Swain

 Film 
Andrew Ahn (2008) – director, Spa Night, Driveways 
Eva Amurri (2007) – actress, Loving Annabelle, Saved!, The Banger Sisters; daughter of Susan Sarandon
 Scott E. Anderson (Sc.B. 1986) – Academy Award-winning Visual Effects Supervisor, Babe, and nominee Starship Troopers, Hollow Man Bess Armstrong (1975) – actress, The Four Seasons (1981), High Road to China Raymond J. Barry (A.B) – actor, Born on the Fourth of July, Steel CityDavid Bartis (A.B. 1988) – producer, The Wall, Edge of Tomorrow, Fair Game
 Randall Batinkoff (1990) – actor, For Keeps, School TiesSteve Bloom (A.B. 1978) – screenwriter, James and the Giant Peach, The Sure Thing, Tall Tale, Jack FrostJoseph Bologna – actor, My Favorite Year, Blame It on RioSara Colangelo (A.B. 2001) – writer and director, Little Accidents, WorthDavid Conrad (A.B. 1990) – actor, Wedding Crashers, Ghost Whisperer Michael Costigan (1990) – producer, Brokeback Mountain, American Gangster, Under the Banner of HeavenLouis Ozawa Changchien (M.F.A. 2006) – actor, Predators, The Bourne Legacy, Bosch 
Yaya Da Costa (A.B. 2004) – actress, Take the Lead, Honeydripper, The Kids Are All Right, The Butler; fashion model
 Lucy DeVito (A.B. 2005) – actress, Melissa and Joey, Leaves of Grass Tom Dey (A.B. 1987) – director, Shanghai Noon, Showtime, Failure to Launch, Marmaduke, Wedding Season Alice Drummond (A.B. 1950) – actress, Awakenings, Nobody's Fool (1994), Doubt (2008)
 Richard Fleischer (A.B. 1939) – director, 20,000 Leagues Under the Sea (1954), The Narrow Margin, Fantastic Voyage, Tora! Tora! Tora!, The Boston Strangler, Doctor Dolittle, Mandingo, Soylent Green; Academy Award-winning documentary producer, Design for Death Josh Friedman (1989) – screenwriter, War of the Worlds, The Black Dahlia; executive producer, Terminator: The Sarah Connor Chronicles; developer, Snowpiercer
 Liz Garbus (A.B. 1992) – Academy Award-nominated documentary filmmaker, What Happened, Miss Simone?, The Farm: Angola, USA, Killing in the Name, All In: The Fight for Democracy, Ghosts of Abu Ghraib Francesca Gregorini (A.B. 1990) – Italian-American writer and film director
Davis Guggenheim (1986) – Academy Award-winning documentary film director, An Inconvenient Truth, It Might Get Loud, and Waiting for "Superman"; film director for Gracie, Gossip (2000), and episodes of 24, Alias, The Shield, ER, NYPD Blue John Hamburg (A.B. 1992) – director, I Love You, Man, Along Came Polly; screenwriter, Zoolander, Meet the Parents, Meet the Fockers Josh Hamilton (1991) – actor, Eighth Grade, 13 Reasons WhyHill Harper (A.B. 1988) – actor, Constellation, Lackawanna Blues, CSI: NYPhil Hay – screenwriter, Destroyer, The Invitation, Ride Along Todd Haynes (A.B. 1983) – Academy Award-nominated writer/director, Mildred Pierce, I'm Not There, Far from Heaven, Velvet Goldmine, Safe (1995), Poison, Dark Waters, The Velvet Underground David Hedison (Class of 1949) – film, television, and stage actor
Sean Hood (1988) – screenwriter, Conan the Barbarian, Halloween: Resurrection, Cursed, Cube 2: Hypercube Ruth Hussey (A.B. 1933) – Academy Award-nominated actress, The Philadelphia Story Oren Jacoby (1977) – Academy Award-nominated documentarian, Constantine's Sword Kirsten Johnson (1987) - documentarian, director, and cinematographer, Dick Johnson Is Dead, Cameraperson Rory Kennedy (A.B. 1991) – independent filmmaker, Moxie Firecracker Films, Inc.; Ghosts of Abu Ghraib Simon Kinberg (A.B. 1995) – screenwriter and producer, X-Men: Days of Future Past, Sherlock Holmes, Jumper (2008), X-Men: The Last Stand, Mr. & Mrs. Smith (2005)
Alison Klayman (A.B. 2006) – documentary filmmaker and journalist, Ai Weiwei: Never SorryPaul Kowalski (A.B. 2004) – film director and screenwriter, Paper Tiger (2020)
 John Krasinski (A.B. 2001) – playwright, actor, director, and producer, The Office, Jack Ryan, A Quiet Place, A Quiet Place Part II, Brief Interviews with Hideous Men, License to Wed, 13 Hours: The Secret Soldiers of Benghazi Ellen Kuras (1981) – cinematographer, Eternal Sunshine of the Spotless Mind, Blow, He Got Game, Summer of Sam, Be Kind Rewind Jonathan Levine (A.B. 2000) – writer/director, Warm Bodies, 50/50 (2011), The Wackness, All The Boys Love Mandy Lane Doug Liman (A.B. 1988) – director and producer, The O.C., Edge of Tomorrow, Fair Game (2010),Jumper (2008), Mr. & Mrs. Smith (2005), The Bourne Identity (2002), The Bourne Supremacy, Go (1999), Swingers (1996)
 Laura Linney (A.B. 1986) – three-time Academy Award and two-time Tony Award-nominated actress, The Big C, The Savages, The Nanny Diaries, The Squid and the Whale, The Exorcism of Emily Rose, Kinsey, Mystic River, Love Actually, You Can Count on Me, The Truman Show, Absolute Power, Primal Fear, Ozark Kurt Luedtke (A.B. 1961) – Academy Award-winning screenwriter, Out of Africa Kátia Lund (A.B. 1989) – co-director, Cidade de Deus (City of God) (2002)
 George Macready (A.B. 1921) – actor of film, stage, and television, Tora! Tora! Tora!, Paths of Glory Eli Marienthal (Class of 2008) – actor, Confessions of a Teenage Drama Queen, The Iron Giant, Jack Frost (1998)
 Matt Manfredi – screenwriter, Crazy/Beautiful, Ride Along, The Mysterious Benedict SocietyRoss McElwee (A.B. 1970) – documentary filmmaker, Sherman's March (1986) and Bright Leaves Leah Meyerhoff (A.B. 2001) – Student Academy Award-nominated writer/director, Twitch Tim Blake Nelson (A.B. 1986) – actor, Lincoln (2012), The Incredible Hulk, Syriana, Minority Report, O Brother, Where Art Thou?, The Thin Red Line (1998); director, Leaves of Grass, O, The Grey Zone Lorraine Nicholson (2012) – actress, Soul Surfer Yoruba Richen (A.B. 1994) – film director, screenwriter, and producer
Angela Robinson (A.B. 1992) – director, Herbie: Fully Loaded, D.E.B.S. (2003), D.E.B.S. (2004)
Jane Rosenthal – founder of the Tribeca Film Festival
Danny Rubin (A.B. 1979) – screenwriter, Groundhog Day Michael Showalter (A.B. 1992) – actor/writer/director, Wet Hot American Summer, The Baxter and the series The State, Stella and Michael & Michael Have Issues Leelee Sobieski (Class of 2005) – actress, Eyes Wide Shut, Never Been Kissed, Here on Earth, Joy Ride (2001), The Glass House (2001), Wicker Man (2006), 88 Minutes, Public Enemies (2009); nominated for an Emmy for Joan of Arc Alison Stewart (A.B. 1988) – radio and television journalist; filmmaker
 Matthew Sussman – actor, documentary filmmaker
 Sara Tanaka (A.B. 2000) – actress, Rushmore, Old School, Imaginary HeroesAstra Taylor (Class of 2001) – activist and filmmaker, Zizek!, Examined Life, What Is Democracy? Christine Vachon (A.B. 1983) – acclaimed independent film producer, I'm Not There, Infamous (2006), The Notorious Bettie Page, Far From Heaven, Hedwig and the Angry Inch, Boys Don't Cry (1999); executive producer, This American Life Andrew Wagner (A.B. 1985) – writer, director, Starting Out in the Evening, The Talent Given Us Earl Wallace (A.B. 1955) – Academy Award-winning screenwriter, Witness Julie Warner (A.B. 1987) – actress, Doc Hollywood, Tommy Boy Emma Watson (A.B. 2014) – actress, model, and activist, Harry Potter, The Perks of Being a Wallflower, Beauty and the Beast (2017), Little Women (2019)
 Betsy West (1973) – filmmaker and director, RBG, My Name is Pauli Murray; Fred W. Friendly Professor of Professional Practice in Media Society Emeritus, Columbia University Graduate School of Journalism
JoBeth Williams (A.B. 1970) – actress, The Big Chill, PoltergeistJeff Zimbalist (2000) – filmmaker, Favela Rising Television 
 Sosie Bacon (Class of 2014) – actress, 13 Reasons Why, Loverboy, Smile; daughter of Kevin Bacon and Kyra Sedgwick
Iris Bahr (1998) – actress, Larry the Cable Guy: Health Inspector, Curb Your Enthusiasm 
Kenneth Biller (1986) – television producer, writer, and director
Julie Bowen (A.B. 1991) – actress, Modern Family, Boston Legal, Ed, Happy Gilmore Roger Bowen (A.B.) – comedic actor, M*A*S*H; novelist
Warren Brown – host, Sugar Rush Jessica Capshaw (A.B. 1998) – actress, Grey's Anatomy, The Practice, Minority Report 
 Jordan Carlos (A.B. 2001) – comedian, Stephen Colbert's "black friend"
 Charise Castro Smith (A.B. 2005) actress, writer, playwright, producer, The Exorcist, The Haunting of Hill House, EncantoKitty Chen (A.B. 1966) – actress, Law & Order, writer
 Nick Chinlund – actor, The X-FilesJude Ciccolella (A.B. 1969) – actor, best known for his role as Mike Novick in 24 Yaya DaCosta (A.B. 2004) – actress and model
Joel de la Fuente (A.B. 1991) – actor, best known for his role as Dr. Johann Pryce in Hemlock GroveAunjanue Ellis (A.B. 1993) – actress, The MentalistIndia Ennenga (A.B.) – actress, Treme Eve Gordon (A.B. 1978) – actress, Recount, Honey, We Shrunk Ourselves, Felicity, American Horror Story, Don't Trust the B---- in Apartment 23, Supernatural Robin Green (1967) – Emmy Award-winning writer and producer, The Sopranos, Northern Exposure Andy Greenwald (1999)– writer, podcaster, and producer
Jonathan Groff (A.B. 1983) – actor, BlackAF; producer, Black-ish; writer, The Jon Stewart Show and Late Night with Conan O'BrienDavid Groh (1961) – actor, Rhoda Marin Hinkle (1988) – actress, The Marvelous Mrs. Maisel, Once and Again, Two and a Half Men Takehiro Hira (1997) – Japanese-born actor, Giri/Haji, SekigaharaTina Holmes (1995) – actress, Six Feet Under Peter Jacobson (1987) – actor, House M.D. Rafe Judkins (2005) – contestant on Survivor: Guatemala, television writer
 Rhonda Ross Kendrick (A.B. 1993) – Daytime Emmy-nominated actress, Another World, daughter of Diana Ross
 Rory Kennedy (A.B. 1990) – Emmy Award-winning documentary producer, director, and writer, American Hollow, Ghosts of Abu Ghraib John Krasinski (A.B. 2002) – actor, The Office, Leatherheads, License to Wed; director, A Quiet Place
 Clea Lewis (A.B. 1987) – actress, Ellen, Andy Barker, P.I. Florencia Lozano (A.B. 1992) – actress, One Life to LiveIan Maxtone-Graham (A.B. 1982.5) – writer, producer, The Simpsons, Saturday Night Live Silas Weir Mitchell (A.B. 1991) – actor, GrimmPeter Nowalk (A.B. 2000) – creator, How to Get Away with Murder; producer, Scandal, Grey's AnatomyMasi Oka (Sc.B. 1997) – actor, Heroes, Scrubs, Will and Grace, Gilmore Girls, Get SmartMonica Owusu-Breen (1990) – writer, Alias, Lost; executive producer, Brothers & Sisters, Midnight, TexasJohn Pleshette (1964) – actor, Knots Landing, The Trial of Lee Harvey OswaldTracee Ellis Ross (A.B. 1995) – actress, Girlfriends, Black-ish, daughter of Diana Ross
 Ben Shenkman (A.B. 1990) – actor, Royal Pains and Angels in AmericaSam Trammell (A.B. 1991) – actor, True Blood Bee Vang (2015) – actor, Gran Torino, writer
 Julie Warner (A.B. 1987) – actress, Nip/Tuck, Family Law, The Guiding Light Suzanne Whang (Sc. M. 1986) – General Hospital, Las Vegas; host HGTV's House Hunters David Walton (2001) – actor, About a BoyMoisés Zamora (A.B. 2000) – creator, Selena: The Series Theater 
 Ayad Akhtar (1993) – Pulitzer Prize–winning playwright, DisgracedAdam Bock (1989) – Obie Award-winning playwright, The Thugs Kate Burton (A.B. 1979) – actress; nominated for three Tony Awards; on Grey's Anatomy as Dr. Ellis Grey
 Zoë Chao (A.B. 2008) – actress in theatre and star of her own television show The God Particles; currently starring as Isobel in Facebook Watch drama Strangers Nilo Cruz (M.F.A. 1994) – Pulitzer Prize–winning playwright, Anna in the Tropics Daveed Diggs (A.B. 2004) – actor, Tony Award-winning originator of the roles of Thomas Jefferson and Marquis de Lafayette in the Pulitzer-Prize winning 2015 musical Hamilton Jackie Sibblies Drury (M.F.A.) – Pulitzer Prize–winning playwright, Fairview Gina Gionfriddo (M.F.A. 1997) – playwright, two-time Pulitzer Prize finalist, Becky Shaw (2009) and Rapture, Blister, Burn (2013); producer, Law and Order Ann Harada (A.B. 1985) – actress in the original Broadway casts of Avenue Q and Cinderella Quiara Alegría Hudes (M.F.A. 2004) – Pulitzer Prize–winning playwright, Water by the Spoonful, In the Heights (Tony Award winner for Best Musical), Elliot, a Soldier's Fugue, In the Heights Stephen Karam (2002) – playwright, Speech & Debate (2006); Tony Award winner, The Humans (2016); two-time Pulitzer Prize finalist, Sons of the Prophet (2012) and The Humans James Naughton (A.B. 1967) – actor, two-time Tony Award winner for City of Angels (1992) and Chicago (1996); also featured in films such as The Paper Chase (1973), The Glass Menagerie (1987) and The Devil Wears Prada (2006)
John Ford Noonan (A.B. 1964) – actor and playwright best known for A Coupla White Chicks Sitting Around Talking Lynn Nottage (A.B. 1986) – first female playwright to win the Pulitzer Prize twice, MacArthur fellowship recipient, Ruined, Sweat Sarah Ruhl (A.B. 1997, M.F.A 2001) – playwright and two-time Pulitzer Prize finalist, recipient of the MacArthur fellowship, The Clean House, Eurydice, Passion Play, In the Next Room (or The Vibrator Play) Burt Shevelove (1937) – Tony Award-winning playwright, A Funny Thing Happened on the Way to the Forum Alfred Uhry (1958) – playwright; Pulitzer Prize, Academy Award and Tony Award winner, Driving Miss Daisy, The Last Night of Ballyhoo Amy Van Nostrand – actress, The HothouseDavid Yazbek (1982) – Tony and Emmy Award-winning writer, musician, composer, and lyricist, The Band's Visit (2017), The Full Monty (2000), Dirty Rotten Scoundrels (2005) and Women on the Verge of a Nervous Breakdown (2010)
 John Lloyd Young (A.B. 1998) – actor; Tony Award winner for Jersey Boys (2006); lead vocalist, 2007 Grammy-winning Jersey Boys album for Clint Eastwood's 2014 Jersey Boys; member of President's Committee on the Arts and Humanities

Religion and theology
 Alfred W. Anthony (A.B. 1883) – Professor at Bates College and Cobb Divinity School, author, Free Will Baptist minister
 Mark E. Brennan (A.B. 1969) – Catholic auxiliary bishop of Baltimore
 Alexander Viets Griswold (A.B. 1810) – Episcopal Bishop of the Eastern Diocese, which included all of New England with the exception of the Episcopal Diocese of Connecticut
 Mark Antony DeWolfe Howe (A.B. 1828) – first Bishop of the Episcopal Diocese of Central Pennsylvania (now Diocese of Bethlehem)
 William Bullein Johnson (A.M. 1814) – South Carolina Baptist leader; first president of the Southern Baptist Convention; instrumental figure in the founding Furman University, out of which emerged Southern Baptist Theological Seminary
 Adoniram Judson (A.B. 1807) – Baptist missionary; due in part to his efforts, Myanmar has the third largest number of Baptists worldwide
 Swami Kriyananda (1945–47) – founder of the Ananda movement
Yehuda Kurtzer (A.M. 2001) – President of the Shalom Hartman Institute of North America
Jonathan Maxcy (A.B. 1787) – President of Brown University and Baptist minister
 George Maxwell Randall (A.B. 1835) – Bishop of the Episcopal Diocese of Colorado and Parts Adjacent
Katherine Sonderegger (Ph.D. 1990) – William Meade Chair in Systematic Theology at Virginia Theological Seminary
 Joshua Toulmin (A.M. 1769) – English dissenting minister with U.S. sympathies

Royalty and nobility
 Prince Rahim Aga Khan (A.B. 1995) – eldest son of Prince Karim Aga Khan IV
Prince Alexander-Georg von Auersperg (1983) – son of Sunny von Bülow
Countess Cosima von Bülow Pavoncelli (1989) – daughter of Claus von Bülow and Sunny von Bülow
Prince Alexander von Fürstenberg (A.B. 1993) – businessman, son of Diane von Fürstenberg and Prince Egon von Fürstenberg
Princess Tatiana von Fürstenberg (A.B. 1991) –singer-songwriter, daughter of Diane von Fürstenberg and Prince Egon von Fürstenberg
Prince Faisal bin Al Hussein (Sc.B. 1985) – son of the late King Hussein of Jordan; Commander of the Jordan Royal Air Force
Lady Gabriella Kingston (A.B. 2004) – freelance writer and member of the royal family of the United Kingdom
Prince Nikolaos of Greece and Denmark (A.B. 1993) – member of the titular royal family of Greece
Princess Nissa Raad (A.B. 2002) – member of the Jordanian Royal Family
Princesss Lila Pahlavi (A.B. 1992) – Princess of Iran; youngest daughter of Mohammad Reza Pahlavi, deposed Shah of Iran
 Princess Theodora of Greece and Denmark (A.B. 2006) – member of the titular royal family of Greece
Lady Gabriella Windsor (A.B. 2004) – member of the British royal family

Fine and applied arts

 Architecture 
 Stan Allen (A.B. 1978) – architect; George Dutton '27 Professor of Architecture and former Dean (2002 – 2012), Princeton University School of Architecture
Edwin T. Banning (1885) – architect active in Rhode Island
 Prescott O. Clarke (1880) – architect active in Rhode Island
Henry Atherton Frost – architect
 Sarah Williams Goldhagen (A.B. 1982) – architectural critic
John G. Haskell – architect of Kansas public buildings, including the Kansas State Capitol
 Raymond Hood (1898–99) – architect of the Tribune Tower in Chicago and Rockefeller Center in New York
 Charles Evans Hughes III (A.B.) – architect, grandson of Charles Evans Hughes
Francis L. V. Hoppin (A.B.) – architect
 Norman Isham (A.B. 1886, M.A. 1890) – Rhode Island historical architect
Harry Wild Jones – architect
John Black Lee – mid-century modern architect
Robert Somol (A.B. 1982) – architectural theorist
Laurinda Hope Spear (B.F.A. 1972) – architect, co-founder of Arquitectonica
 Thomas Alexander Tefft (1851) – pioneer American architect

 Design 
 Jonathan Adler (A.B. 1988) – potter, designer and author
Julie Carlson (A.B. 1983) – co-founder of Remodelista
 Tom Geismar (A.B. 1953) – graphic designer, designer of the PBS and Mobil logos
 Chuck Hoberman (1974–1976) – designer, inventor of the Hoberman sphere

 Fashion 

 Montana Levi Blanco (A.M.) – costume designer, recipient of the 2022 Tony Award for Best Costume Design in a Play
 Dana Buchman (A.B. 1973) – fashion designer
 Kimberly Ovitz (A.B. 2005) – fashion designer
 André Leon Talley (A.M. 1973) – Vogue magazine editor-at-large; first African-American male creative director of Vogue Visual arts 
David Aldrich (A.B. 1929) – watercolor painter
 Deborah Aschheim (A.B. 1986) – new media artist
 Marc Erwin Babej (A.B. 1992) – photographic artist, writer
Éric Baudelaire (A.B. 1994) – artist
Richard Benson (1961) – photographer, Dean of the Yale School of Art (1996–2006), recipient of the MacArthur Fellowship
Bill Bollinger (1961) – minimalist sculptor and installation artist
Dawn Clements (A.B. 1986) – contemporary artist known for her panoramas
 Dave Cole (A.B. 2000) – sculptor, visual artist
 John Connell (Class of 1962) – sculptor and painter
Devon Dikeou (A.B. 1986) – artist and curator
 Barnaby Evans (1975) – creator of the environmental art installation WaterFire
Ayana Evans (A.B. 1998) – performance artist
 Brian Floca (A.B. 1991) – author and book illustrator
 Coco Fusco (A.B. 1982) – interdisciplinary artist and feminist
Susan Freedman (A.B. 1982) – president of the Public Art Fund
Chitra Ganesh (A.B. 1996) – artist
Orly Genger (A.B. 2001) – contemporary sculptor and installation artist
Sanford Robinson Gifford (A.B. 1844) – landscape painter of the Hudson River School
 Isca Greenfield-Sanders (A.B. 2000) – artist
 Karl Haendel (A.B. 1998) – artist known for his pencil drawings
 Ilana Halperin (A.B. 1995) – artist
 George Hitchcock (A.B. 1872) – impressionist painter
Akiko Ichikawa (A.B. 1994) – interdisciplinary visual artist and writer
 Bill Jacobson (A.B. 1977) – photographer
 Ken Johnson (A.B. 1976) – art critic for the New York Times Paul Ramirez Jonas (A.B. 1987) – contemporary artist; Chair of the Department of Art, Cornell University College of Architecture, Art, and Planning
 Nina Katchadourian (A.B. 1989) – multimedia artist
 Richard Kostelanetz (A.B. 1962) – book-art, audio, video, photography, film, holography
 Paul Laffoley (A.B. 1962) – artist and architect
 Walter Liedtke (A.M. 1969) – curator of European paintings Metropolitan Museum of Art
Candice Lin (A.B 2001) – artist
Sarah Morris (A.B. 1988) – contemporary painter and filmmaker
Elizabeth Neel (A.B. 1997) – contemporary painter
Lisa Oppenheim (A.B. 1998) – multimedia artist
 Sarah Oppenheimer (A.B. 1995) – sculptor and installation artist
 Maureen Paley (A.B. 1975) – established the first East End gallery in London, represents the work of important contemporary artists
 Bern Porter (Sc.M. 1933) – visual artist and scientist involved in the development of the cathode-ray tube and the Manhattan Project
Seth Price (A.B. 1997) – post-conceptual artist
Lauren Redniss (A.B. 1996) – artist and writer, recipient of Guggenheim Fellowship and MacArthur Fellowship
Willoughby Sharp (A.B. 1957) – pioneer in conceptual and performance art
Jeff Shesol (A.B. 1991) – cartoonist, Thatch; scriptwriter for Bill Clinton
 Taryn Simon (A.B. 1997) – multidisciplinary artist
 Scott Snibbe (A.B. 1991, M.Sc. 1994) – interactive media artist
 Anne Morgan Spalter (A.B. 1987) – digital mixed media artist and pioneering computer art academic; founder of Brown's and RISD's original digital fine arts courses
Martha Tedeschi (A.B. 1980) – Elizabeth and John Moors Cabot Director of the Harvard Art Museums
Kerry Tribe (A.B. 1997) – installation artist
 Mark Tribe (A.B. 1990) – artist; chair of the School of Visual Arts' MFA program
Marcus Waterman (1857) – Orientalist painter
Virgil Macey Williams (1847–1850) – painter, co-founder of the San Francisco Art Association
 Saya Woolfalk (A.B. 2001) – multimedia artist

 Game Design 

 Elizabeth Hargrave (1994) – board game designer

Athletics
 Baseball 
 Bill Almon (1975) – professional baseball player for the San Diego Padres, New York Mets, Chicago White Sox, Oakland Athletics and Pittsburgh Pirates; #1 pick in the 1974 draft
 Mark Attanasio (A.B. 1979) – financier and owner of the Milwaukee Brewers
 Charley Bassett – professional baseball player
 Tommy Dowd – professional baseball player
 Dave Fultz – professional baseball player
 Irving "Bump" Hadley (Class of 1928) – professional baseball player, pitcher for the Washington Senators and New York Yankees
 Mike Lynch – professional baseball player
 Frank Philbrick – professional baseball player
 Lee Richmond – professional baseball player, pitched the first perfect game in major league baseball history
 Fred Tenney – professional baseball player
William Edward White – possibly the first African-American to play major league baseball

 Basketball 
 Lindsay Gottlieb (1999) – head coach, USC Trojans women's basketball
Bernard Muir (1990) – athletic director at Stanford University
Stephen Silas (1996) – head coach for the Houston Rockets

 Football 
 Don Colo (1950) – professional football player, three-time Pro Bowl selection; played for the Cleveland Browns
 Zak DeOssie (2007) – linebacker and long snapper for the New York Giants, two-time Pro Bowl selection (2008, 2010)
 James Develin (2010) – fullback for the New England Patriots; 2014 and 2016 Super Bowl Champion; 2017 Pro Bowl selection
 John W. Heisman (Class of 1891) – college football player and coach; namesake of the Heisman Trophy
 Steve Jordan (Sc.B. 1982) – professional football player, six-time All-Pro tight end who played for the Minnesota Vikings
 Sean Morey (1999) – Special Teams Captain of 2005 Super Bowl XL Champion Pittsburgh Steelers
 Bill O'Brien (A.B. 1992) – Offensive cordinator and quarterbacks coach at the University of Alabama, former head Coach at Penn State
 Curly Oden (1921) – National Football League running back and member of 1928 league champion Providence Steam Roller
 Joe Paterno (A.B. 1950) – Head Coach for Penn State (1966–2011), all-time winningest Division I football coach
 Fritz Pollard (A.B. 1919) – first black All-American halfback; first black National Football League head coach; as a player, led the Akron Pros to the NFL's first-ever championship in 1920; inducted into the Pro Football Hall of Fame
 Edward North Robinson (1896) – football coach at University of Nebraska–Lincoln, Brown, Tufts, Boston University, and for the Providence Steam Roller; member of the College Football Hall of Fame
 Wallace Wade (1917) – football coach at the University of Alabama and then Duke, member of the College Football Hall of Fame; namesake of Duke's football stadium

 Ice hockey 

 Curt Bennett (1970) – professional ice hockey player, St. Louis Blues and Atlanta Flames
 Yann Danis (A.B. 2004) – professional ice hockey goaltender for the New York Islanders
 Brian Eklund (A.B. 2002) – professional ice hockey goaltender for the Tampa Bay Lightning
 Garnet Hathaway (2014) – professional ice hockey forward for the Washington Capitals
 Brian Ihnacak (1985) – professional ice hockey forward for HC '05 Banská Bystrica
 Sam Lafferty (2018) – professional ice hockey forward for the Pittsburgh Penguins

 Lacrosse 

 Timothy Kelly (2002) – General Manager of the New York Titans of the National Lacrosse League
Dylan Molloy (2017) – player for the Chrome Lacrosse Club
 Lars Tiffany (1990) – head coach of the Virginia Cavaliers men's lacrosse program at the University of Virginia
 Dom Starsia (1974) – former head coach of the Virginia Cavaliers men's lacrosse program at the University of Virginia

 Olympics 

 Gold 
 Tessa Gobbo (2013) – American rower, Olympic gold (2016) medalist in women's coxed eight rowing
Helen Johns Carroll (A.B. 1936) – American freestyle swimmer, Olympic gold (1932) medalist
Becky Kellar-Duke (1997) – Canadian ice hockey player, Olympic gold (2002, 2006, 2010) and silver (1998) medalist
Katie King (1997) – American ice hockey player, Olympic gold (1998), silver (2002), and bronze (2006) medalist
Tara Mounsey (Sc.B. 2001) – American ice hockey player, Olympic gold (1998) and silver (2002) medalist
Xeno Müller (2002) – Swiss rower, Olympic gold (1996) and silver (2000) medalist in the single scull
 Albina Osipowich (A.B. 1933) – American freestyle swimmer, Olympic gold (1928) medals in the 100-meter freestyle and 4×100-meter freestyle
Alicia Sacramone (2010) – American gymnast, Olympic silver (2008) medal in the women's artistic team all-around
Jack Spellman (1924) – American wrestler, Olympic gold (1924) medal in the men's freestyle light heavyweight
Norman Taber (1913) – American runner, Olympic gold (1912) medal in the 3000m relay

 Silver 
Lauren Gibbs (2006) – American bobsledder, Olympic silver (2018) medalist in women's doubles bobsled
Jonathan Smith (1983) – American rower, Olympic silver (1984) and bronze (1988) medalist in the coxless four and men's eight
John Welchli (1950) – American rower, Olympic silver (1956)
Vincent Zhou (2023) – American figure skater, Olympic silver in the team event (2022) 

 Bronze 
Igor Boraska (1995) – Croatian rower, Olympic bronze (2000) medal in the eights competition
Robert Bennett (1949) – American athlete, Olympic bronze (1948) medal in the men's hammer throw
Charles Thomas Butler (1955) – American bobsledder, Olympic bronze (1956) medal in the four-man
John Collier (1929) – American athlete, Olympic bronze (1928) medal in the 110 metre hurdles
Pam Dreyer (2003) – American ice hockey player, Olympic bronze (2006) medal in the women's tournament
Glen Foster (1952) – American sailor, Olympic bronze (1972) medal in the Tempest class''
David Hall (1901) – American runner, Olympic bronze (1900) medalist in the 800 meter race
 Kim Insalaco (2003) – American ice hockey player, Olympic bronze (2006) medal in the women's tournament
 Kathleen Kauth (2001) – American ice hockey player, Olympic bronze (2006) medalist
 Janet Leung (2016) – Canadian softball player, Olympic bronze (2020)
 Ted Patton (1988) – American rower, Olympic bronze (1988)
Jimmy Pedro (A.B. 1994) – most decorated American male judo athlete; Judo World Champion (1999); two-time Olympic bronze medalist (1996, 2004)
Donald Whiston (1951) – American ice hockey player, Olympic bronze (1952) medal in the men's tournament

Competitors 
Hanna Barakat (2022) – Palestinian–American runner, competed at the 2020 Summer Olympics
Dick Dreissigacker (1969) – American rower, competed in the 1972 Summer Olympics
Cicely Madden (2018) – American rower, competed at the 2020 Summer Olympics
Rajanya Shah (1996) – American rower, competed at the 2000 Summer Olympics
Jagger Stephens (2020) – Guamanian swimmer, competed at the 2020 Summer Olympics
Nikola Stojić (1997) – Serbian rower, competed in four consecutive Summer Olympics (2000, 2004, 2008, 2012)
 Evan Weinstock (1914) – American bobsledder, competed at the 2018 Winter Olympics
Anders Weiss (2016) – American rower, competed at the 2020 Summer Olympics
 Anna Willard (2006) – 2008 Olympic qualifier in 3000m steeplechase, American record holder in 3000m steeplechase
 Joanna Zeiger (1992) – fourth in inaugural Olympic Women's Triathlon, 2000 Summer Olympics, Sydney; Olympic trial qualifier in marathon, triathlon and swimming; world champion in triathlon

Other sports 
 Rhett Bernstein (2009) – professional soccer player
 Mark Donohue (1959) – professional race car driver; 1972 Indianapolis 500 winner; fatally injured in a crash in practice for the Formula One 1975 Austrian Grand Prix; inducted into the Motorsports Hall of Fame of America and the International Motorsports Hall of Fame (1991)
 Cory Gibbs (2001) – professional soccer player, Charlton Athletic, FA Premier League
 Fred Hovey (1890) – professional tennis player, US Open Men's Doubles Champion (1893) and Men's Singles Champion (1895)
 Jeff Larentowicz (2005) – professional soccer player, New England Revolution, Major League Soccer
 Bill Wirtz (1950) – owner of the Chicago Blackhawks

Colonial Era graduates (1769–1783)
 Solomon Drowne (A.B. 1773) – physician
 Dwight Foster (A.B. 1770) – United States Senator from Massachusetts, Member of the U.S. House of Representatives from Massachusetts
 Theodore Foster (A.B. 1770) – United States Senator from Rhode Island
 David Howell (A.M. 1769) – Delegate to the Congress of the Confederation
 Joshua Toulmin (A.M. 1769) – English dissenting minister
 James Mitchell Varnum (A.B. 1769) – leader of 1st Rhode Island Regiment, widely regarded as the first Black battalion in U.S. history
 Samuel Ward Jr. (A.B. 1771) – delegate to the Hartford Convention

Unclassified
 Michael V. Bhatia (A.B. 1999) – Medal of Freedom recipient
 Susan Bennett (1971) – voice actress, original voice of Apple's Siri
Florencio Campomanes (A.M. 1951) – former president of the World Chess Federation
 Amy Carter (Class of 1989) – daughter of former President Jimmy Carter; political activist
Andrew Dexter Jr. (A.B. 1798) – founder of Montgomery, Alabama
 Isaac Haxton (2008) – professional poker player
Douglas Harriman Kennedy (A.B.) – tenth child of Robert F. Kennedy and Ethel Kennedy
Alexandra Kerry (A.B. 1997) – daughter of presidential candidate and U.S. Senator John Kerry
 Sadad Ibrahim Al Husseini (M.S. 1970, Ph.D. 1973) – oil and gas industry expert
Theodore Morde (1935–36) – famed explorer and adventurer who claimed to have discovered the "Lost City of the Monkey God" in Honduras
 Cara Mund (Class of 2016) – Miss America 2018
 Allegra Versace (Class of 2008) – heiress to Gianni Versace's fortune and daughter of Donatella Versace

References

Lists of people by university or college in Rhode Island
Alumni